The following film directors and film score composers have worked together on multiple projects.

A 
Ali Abbasi
Martin Dirkov
Shelley (2016)
Border (2018)
J. J. Abrams

Michael Giacchino
Alias (2001–2006) 
Lost (2004–2010) 
Mission: Impossible III (2006)
Fringe (2008–2013)
Star Trek (2009)
Super 8 (2011)
Mission: Impossible – Ghost Protocol (2011) - Produced by
Star Trek Into Darkness (2013)
Star Trek Beyond (2016) - Produced by
John Williams
Star Wars: The Force Awakens (2015)
Star Wars: The Last Jedi (2017) - Executive Producer
Star Wars: The Rise of Skywalker (2019)

Lenny Abrahamson
Stephen Rennicks
Adam & Paul (2004)
Garage (2007)
What Richard Did (2012)
Frank (2014)
Room (2015)
The Little Stranger (2018)
Normal People (2020)
Andrew Adamson
Harry Gregson-Williams
Shrek (2001)
Shrek 2 (2004)
The Chronicles of Narnia: The Lion, the Witch and the Wardrobe (2005)
Shrek the Third (2007) - Executive Producer
The Chronicles of Narnia: Prince Caspian (2008)
Shrek Forever After (2010) - Executive Producer
Mr. Pip (2013)
Ben Affleck
Harry Gregson-Williams
Gone Baby Gone (2007)
The Town (2010)
Live by Night (2017)
Alan Alda
Bruce Broughton
Sweet Liberty (1986)
Betsy's Wedding (1990)
Moustapha Akkad
Maurice Jarre
The Message (1976)
Lion of the Desert (1980)
Robert Aldrich

Gerald Fried
The Killing of Sister George (1968)
Too Late the Hero (1970)
The Grissom Gang (1971)
Frank De Vol
World for Ransom (1954)
Kiss Me Deadly (1955)
The Big Knife (1955)
Attack (1956)
What Ever Happened to Baby Jane? (1962)
Hush... Hush, Sweet Charlotte (1964)
The Flight of the Phoenix (1965)
The Dirty Dozen (1967)
The Legend of Lylah Clare (1968)
Ulzana's Raid (1972)
Emperor of the North Pole (1973)
The Longest Yard (1974)
Hustle (1975)
Twilight's Last Gleaming (1977) Rejected score
The Choirboys (1977)
The Frisco Kid (1979)
...All the Marbles (1981)

Irwin Allen

Paul Sawtell & Bert Shefter
The Sea Around Us (1953) 
The Animal World (1956)
The Story of Mankind (1957)
The Big Circus (1959) 
The Lost World (1960)
Voyage to the Bottom of the Sea (1961)
Five Weeks in a Balloon (1962) 
Voyage to the Bottom of the Sea (1964 to 1965)
The Time Tunnel (1966)
John Williams
Lost in Space (1965–1968)
The Time Tunnel (1966–1967)
Land of Giants (1968–1970)
The Poseidon Adventure (1972) - Produced by
The Towering Inferno (1974) - Produced by

Pedro Almodóvar
Alberto Iglesias
The Flower of My Secret (1995) 
Live Flesh (1997) 
All About My Mother (1999)
Talk to Her (2002)
Bad Education (2004)
Volver (2006) 
Broken Embraces (2009)
The Skin I Live In (2011)
I'm So Excited! (2013) 
Julieta (2016)
Dolor y gloria (2019)
Parallel Mothers (2021)
Robert Altman

Mark Isham
Short Cuts (1993)
Mrs. Parker and the Vicious Circle (1994) - Produced by
Afterglow (1997) - Produced by
The Gingerbread Man (1998)
Trixie (2000) - Produced by
Johnny Mandel
The James Dean Story (1957)	
That Cold Day in the Park (1969)
MASH (1970)
George Burt
Secret Honor (1984)
Fool for Love (1985)
Leonard Rosenman
Combat! (1962-1967) - They collaborated on ten episodes of the series.
Countdown (1968)
John Williams
Kraft Suspense Theatre (1963-1965) - They collaborated on three episodes of the series.
Nightmare in Chicago (1964)
The Katherine Reed Story (1965) - Short
Images (1972)
The Long Goodbye (1973)
Gabriel Yared
Vincent & Theo (1990)
Gosford Park (2001)
Van Dyke Parks
Popeye (1980) - Parks is credited as music arranger and conductor for songs in the film.
The Company (2003)

Fede Álvarez
Roque Banos
Evil Dead (2013)
Don't Breathe (2016)
The Girl in the Spider's Web (2018)
Jon Amiel
Christopher Young
Copycat (1995)
The Man Who Knew Too Little (1997)
Entrapment (1999)
The Core (2003)
Creation (2009)
Sean Anders
Michael Andrews
Daddy's Home (2015)
Daddy's Home 2 (2017)
Instant Family (2018)
Brad Anderson
John Debney
The Call (2013)
Stonehearst Asylum (2014)
High Wire Act (2017)
Gerry Anderson
Barry Gray
Four Feather Falls (1960)
Crossroads to Crime (1960)
Supercar (1961-1962)
Fireball XL5 (1962–1963)
Stingray (1964–1965)
Thunderbirds (1965–1966)
Thunderbirds Are Go (1966)
Captain Scarlet and the Mysterons  (1967–1968)
Thunderbird 6 (1968)
Doppelgänger (1969)
UFO (1970–1971)
Space: 1999 (1975-1977)
Lindsay Anderson
Alan Price
NET Playhouse (1968) - They collaborated on an episode
Play for Today (1972) - They collaborated on an episode. 
O Lucky Man! (1973) 
Britannia Hospital (1982)
The Whales of August (1987)
Is That All There Is? (1992)
Paul Thomas Anderson
Jon Brion
Hard Eight aka Sydney (1996)
Boogie Nights (1997)
Magnolia (1999)
Punch-Drunk Love (2002)
Jonny Greenwood
There Will Be Blood (2007)
The Master (2012)
Inherent Vice (2014)
Phantom Thread (2017)
Licorice Pizza (2021)
Paul W. S. Anderson

Paul Haslinger
Death Race (2008) 
The Three Musketeers (2011) 
Resident Evil: The Final Chapter (2016)
Monster Hunter (2021)
Tomandandy
Resident Evil: Afterlife (2010)
Resident Evil: Retribution (2012)
Marco Beltrami
Resident Evil (2002) with Marilyn Manson
Alien vs. Predator (2004) Rejected Score

Wes Anderson

Alexandre Desplat
Fantastic Mr. Fox (2009)
Moonrise Kingdom (2012)
The Grand Budapest Hotel (2014)
Isle of Dogs (2018)
The French Dispatch (2021)
Asteroid City (2023)
Mark Mothersbaugh
Bottle Rocket (1996)
Rushmore (1998)
The Royal Tenenbaums (2001)
The Life Aquatic with Steve Zissou (2004)

Michael Anderson

William Alwyn
Shake Hands with the Devil (1959)
The Naked Edge (1961)
John Barry
The Quiller Memorandum (1966)
Murder by Phone (1982)
Stanley Myers
Conduct Unbecoming (1975)
Separate Vacations (1986)

Theo Angelopoulos
Eleni Karaindrou
Voyage to Cythera (1984)
The Beekeeper (1986)
Landscape in the Mist (1988)
The Suspended Step of the Stork (1991)
Ulysses' Gaze (1995)
Eternity and a Day (1998)
Trilogy: The Weeping Meadow (2004)
The Dust of Time (2008)
Jean-Jacques Annaud
James Horner
The Name of the Rose (1986)
Enemy at the Gates (2001)
Day of the Falcon (2011)
Wolf Totem (2015)
Hideaki Anno
Shirō Sagisu
Nadia: The Secret of Blue Water (1990–1991) 
Neon Genesis Evangelion (1995–1996) 
Neon Genesis Evangelion: Death & Rebirth (1997)
The End of Evangelion (1997)
His and Her Circumstances (1998–1999)
Evangelion: 1.0 You Are (Not) Alone (2007)
Evangelion: 2.0 You Can (Not) Advance (2009)
Evangelion: 3.0 You Can (Not) Redo (2012)
Shin Godzilla (2016)
Evangelion: 3.0+1.0 Thrice Upon a Time (2021)
Shin Ultraman (2022) - Produced by
Michelangelo Antonioni
Giovanni Fusco
N.U. (1948) (short film)
Seven Reeds, One Suit (1948) (short film)
Superstitions (1949) (short film)
Lies of Love (1949) (short film)
La villa dei mostri (1950) (short film)
Story of a Love Affair (1950)
The Lady Without Camelias (1953)
I vinti (1953)
Le Amiche (1955)
Il Grido (1957)
L'Avventura (1960)
L'Eclisse (1962)
Red Desert (1964)
Judd Apatow

Michael Andrews
Walk Hard: The Dewey Cox Story (2007)
Funny People (2009)
Bridesmaids (2011)
The Five-Year Engagement (2012)
The Big Sick (2017)
The King of Staten Island (2020)
Jon Brion
Step Brothers (2008)
This Is 40 (2012)
Trainwreck (2015)

Michael Apted

David Arnold
The World Is Not Enough (1999)
Enough (2002)
Amazing Grace (2007)
The Chronicles of Narnia: The Voyage of the Dawn Treader (2010)
James Horner
Gorky Park (1983)
Class Action (1991)
Thunderheart (1992)
Crossroads (1992-1993) - They were both involved with the series.
Michael Small
Continental Divide (1981)
Firstborn (1984)

Tetsuro Araki
Hiroyuki Sawano
Guilty Crown (2011)
Attack on Titan (2013–2019)
Kabaneri of the Iron Fortress (2016)
Bubble (2022)

Dario Argento

Goblin
Deep Red (1975)
Suspiria (1977)
Tenebre (1982)
Phenomena (1985)
Sleepless (2001)
Claudio Simonetti
Opera (1987)
The Card Player (2004)
The Mother of Tears (2007)
Dracula 3D (2012)
Masters of Horror  (2005–2007)  -  The episodes "Jenifer" and "Pelts".
The Sandman (2018)
Ennio Morricone
The Bird with the Crystal Plumage (1970)
The Cat o' Nine Tails (1971)
Four Flies on Grey Velvet (1971)
The Stendhal Syndrome (1995)
The Phantom of the Opera (1998)

Gillian Armstrong

Cezary Skubiszewski
Death Defying Acts (2007)
Love, Lust & Lies (2010)
Women He's Undressed (2015)
Thomas Newman
Little Women (1994)
Oscar and Lucinda (1997)
Paul Grabowsky
The Last Days of Chez Nous (1992)
Unfolding Florence: The Many Lives of Florence Broadhurst (2006)

Jack Arnold
John Williams

Kraft Suspense Theatre (1963-1965) - They collaborated on one episode.
Who Goes There? (1965) Short
Gilligan's Island (1964–1967) – They contributed a few episodes in the series.
Henry Mancini
Girls in the Night (1953) – Mancini is an uncredited composer.
It Came from Outer Space (1953) – Mancini is an uncredited composer.
Creature from the Black Lagoon (1954) – Mancini is an uncredited composer.
The Man from Bitter Ridge (1955) – Mancini is an uncredited composer.
Peter Gunn (1958–1961) – They contributed six episodes in the series.
Mr. Lucky (1959–1960) – They contributed some episodes in the series.
Bachelor in Paradise (1961)

Darren Aronofsky
Clint Mansell
Pi (1998)
Requiem for a Dream (2000)
The Fountain (2006)
The Wrestler (2008)
Black Swan (2010)
Noah (2014)
Hal Ashby
Johnny Mandel
The Last Detail (1973)
Being There (1979)
Lookin' to Get Out (1982)
Ari Aster
The Haxan Cloak
Midsommar (2019)
Beau Is Afraid (2023)
Richard Attenborough
George Fenton
Gandhi (1982) With Ravi Shankar.
Cry Freedom (1987)
Shadowlands (1993)
In Love and War (1996)
Grey Owl (1999)
Alfred Ralston
Oh! What a Lovely War (1969)
Young Winston (1972)
John Barry
Séance on a Wet Afternoon (1964) – Produced by
Chaplin (1992)
Bille August
Hans Zimmer
The House of the Spirits (1993)
Smilla's Sense of Snow (1997) with Harry Gregson-Williams. 
Harry Gregson-Williams
Smilla's Sense of Snow (1997) with Hans Zimmer.
Return to Sender (2004)
Hy Averback
Charles Fox
Newman's Drugstore (1976)
The Love Boat II (1977)
Jerry Fielding
Suppose They Gave a War and Nobody Came (1970)
The Chicago Teddy Bears (1971) — They contributed one episode of the series.
McMillan & Wife (1971-1977) — They contributed one episode of the series.
John G. Avildsen
Bill Conti
Rocky (1976)
Slow Dancing in the Big City  (1978)
The Formula (1980)
Murder Ink (1980) — They were both involved with this series. 
Neighbors (1981)
Traveling Hopefully (1982) Short
The Karate Kid (1984)
The Karate Kid Part II (1986)
Happy New Year (1987)
For Keeps (1988)
Lean on Me (1989)
The Karate Kid Part III (1989)
Rocky V (1990)
8 Seconds (1994)
Inferno (1999)
Jon Avnet
Thomas Newman
Less than Zero (1987) — Produced by
Men Don't Leave (1990) — Produced by
Heat Wave (1990) - Produced by
Fried Green Tomatoes (1991)
The War (1994)
Up Close and Personal (1996)
Red Corner (1997)
WIGS (2012-2013)
David Ayer

Steven Price
Fury (2014)
Suicide Squad (2016)
Graeme Revell
Harsh Times (2005)
Street Kings (2008)
David Sardy
End of Watch (2012)
Sabotage (2014)
Bright (2017)

B 
John Badham

Arthur B. Rubinstein
Whose Life is it Anyway? (1981)
Blue Thunder (1983)
WarGames (1983)
Stakeout (1987)
The Hard Way (1991)
Another Stakeout (1993)
Nick of Time (1995)
Floating Away (1998)
The Last Debate (2000)
Hans Zimmer
Bird on a Wire (1990)
Point of No Return (1993)
Drop Zone (1994)
David Shire
The Impatient Heart (1971)
Isn't It Shocking? (1973)
The Godchild (1974)
Saturday Night Fever (1977)
Short Circuit (1986)
John Ottman
Incognito (1997)
Brother's Keeper (2002)

Stuart Baird
Jerry Goldsmith
Executive Decision (1996)
U. S. Marshals (1998)
Star Trek: Nemesis (2002)
Ralph Bakshi

Gary Anderson
Christmas in Tattertown (1988)
Hound Town (1989)
This Ain't Bebop (1989)
The Cartoon Cartoon Show (1997) 
Ed Bogas & Ray Shanklin 
Fritz the Cat (1972)
Heavy Traffic (1973)

Kyle Balda
Heitor Pereira
Minions (2015)
Despicable Me 3 (2017)
Minions: The Rise of Gru (2022)
Justin Baldoni
Brian Tyler
Five Feet Apart (2019)
Clouds (2020)
Charles Band

Richard Band
Parasite (1982)
Metalstorm: The Destruction of Jared-Syn (1983) 
The Alchemist (1984)
The Dungeonmaster (1984) with Shirley Walker – They contributed a segment.
Crash and Burn (1990)
Doctor Mordrid (1992) Albert Band served as co-director.
Prehysteria! (1993) With Michael Bishop. Albert Band served as co-director.
Dollman vs. Demonic Toys (1993)
Hideous! (1997)
Skull Heads (2009)
Evil Bong 3D: The Wrath of Bong (2011)
Puppet Master X: Axis Rising (2012)
Unlucky Charms (2013)
Trophy Heads (2014)
District 78
Doll Graveyard (2005)
Evil Bong (2006)
Dead Man's Hand (2007)
Evil Bong 2: King Bong (2009)
Shirley Walker
Metalstorm: The Destruction of Jared-Syn (1983) – Walker is credited as music conductor. 
The Dungeonmaster (1984) with Richard Band
Ghost Warrior (1984) – Produced by

Wes Ball
John Paesano
The Maze Runner (2014)
Maze Runner: The Scorch Trials (2015)
Maze Runner: The Death Cure (2018)
Tony Barbieri
Harry Gregson-Williams
The Magic of Marciano (2000)
Em (2008)
Bruno Barreto

Marcelo Zarvos
Last Stop 174 (2008)
Reaching for the Moon (2013)
Guto Graça Mello
Amor Bandido (1978)
The Asphalt Kiss (1980)
Romeo and Juliet are Getting Married (2005)
Caixa Dois (2007)
Bruce Broughton
Carried Away (1996)
One Tough Cop (1998)

Craig Bartlett
Jim Lang
Hey Arnold! (1996–2004)
Hey Arnold!: The Movie (2002) - Produced by
Dinosaur Train (2009–2017)
Ready Jet Go! (2016–2019)
Hey Arnold!: The Jungle Movie (2017) - Executive Producer
Jules Bass & Arthur Rankin Jr.

Bernard Hoffer
The Ivory Ape (1980) 
The Coneheads (1983) 
Thundercats (1985) 
The Life & Adventures of Santa Claus (1985)
Silverhawks (1986) 
Maury Laws
The Daydreamer (1966) - Only Jules Bass
The King Kong Show (1966)
Mad Monster Party? (1967)
Cricket on the Hearth (1967) 
Mouse on the Mayflower (1968) 
The Little Drummer Boy (1968)
The Smokey Bear Show (1969)
The Mad, Mad, Mad Comedians (1970)
Santa Claus Is Comin' to Town (1970) 
The Tomfoolery Show (1970)
The Jackson 5ive (1971)
The Enchanted World of Danny Kaye: The Emperor's New Clothes (1972)
The Osmonds (1972) 
Arabian Nights (1972)
The ABC Saturday Superstar Movie (1972) — They collaborated on several episodes. 
Festival of Family Classics (1972) 
'Twas the Night Before Christmas (1974)
The Year Without a Santa Claus (1974)
The First Christmas: The Story of the First Christmas Snow (1975) 
The First Easter Rabbit (1976) 
The Little Drummer Boy Book II (1976)
The Hobbit (1977)
Nestor, the Long-Eared Christmas Donkey (1977)
Jack Frost (1979) 
The Ivory Ape (1980)
The Return of the King (1979)
The Leprechauns' Christmas Gold (1980)
The Flight of Dragons (1982) 
The Wind in the Willows (1987) 

Noah Baumbach
Randy Newman
The Meyerowitz Stories (2017)
Marriage Story (2019)
White Noise (2022)
Michael Bay

Lorne Balfe
13 Hours: The Secret Soldiers of Benghazi (2016)
6 Underground (2019)
Songbird (2020) - Produced by 
Ambulance (2022)
Steve Jablonsky
Bad Boys II (2003) - With Trevor Rabin
The Texas Chainsaw Massacre (2003) - Produced by 
The Amityville Horror (2005) - Produced by 
The Island (2005)
The Texas Chainsaw Massacre: The Beginning (2006) - Produced by 
The Hitcher (2007) - Produced by
Transformers (2007)
Transformers: Revenge of the Fallen (2009)
Friday the 13th (2009) - Produced by 
A Nightmare on Elm Street (2010) - Produced by 
Transformers: Dark of the Moon (2011)
Pain & Gain (2013)
Transformers: Age of Extinction (2014)
Teenage Mutant Ninja Turtles: Out of the Shadows (2016) - Produced by 
Transformers: The Last Knight (2017)
Trevor Rabin
Armageddon (1998)
Bad Boys II (2003)
I Am Number Four (2011) - Produced by
Hans Zimmer
The Rock - With Nick Glennie-Smith. (1996)
Pearl Harbor (2001)
The Island (2005) - Score Producer
Transformers: Revenge of the Fallen (2009) - additional music
Transformers: Age of Extinction (2014) - additional music

J. A. Bayona
Fernando Velázquez
The Orphanage (2007)
The Impossible (2012)
A Monster Calls (2016)
Craig R. Baxley
Gary Chang
A Family Torn Apart (1993)
Deep Red (1994)
The Avenging Angel (1995)
Twisted Desire (1996)
Twilight Man (1996) 
Bad Day on the Block (1997)
Silencing Mary (1998)
Storm of the Century (1999)
Rose Red (2002)
The Glow (2002)
Sniper 2 (2002)
The Diary of Ellen Rimbauer (2003)
Kingdom Hospital (2004)
Left Behind III (2005)
Aces 'N' Eights (2008)
The Gingerbread Girl 
Warren Beatty

Stephen Sondheim
Reds (1981)
Dick Tracy (1990) - Sondheim wrote five songs for the film, while Danny Elfman composed the orchestral score.
Dave Grusin
Heaven Can Wait (1978)
Reds (1981) - additional music
Ishtar (1987) - Produced by 

Harold Becker

Jerry Goldsmith
Malice (1993)
City Hall (1996) 
Maurice Jarre
The Black Marble (1980)
Taps (1981)

Josh Becker
Joseph LoDuca
Thou Shalt Not Kill... Except (1985)
Lunatics: A Love Story (1991)
Hercules in the Maze of the Minotaur (1994)
Xena: Warrior Princess (1995-2001)
Running Time (1997)
Jack of All Trades (2000)
Alien Apocalypse (2005)
Spine Chillers (2013) - They collaborated on an episode.
Morning, Noon & Night (2018)
Greg Beeman

Phil Marshall
Miracle in Lane 2 (2000)
The Ultimate Christmas Present (2000)
A Ring of Endless Light (2002)
David Michael Frank
Problem Child 3: Junior in Love (1995)
Under Wraps (1997)

Donald P. Bellisario
Bruce Broughton
Last Rites (1988)
JAG (1995-2005) - They contributed a two-part pilot episode in the series premiere.
First Monday (2002) - They contributed a pilot episode of the series.
Richard Benjamin

John Frizzell
The Goodbye Girl (2004)
A Little Thing Called Murder (2006)
Joseph Vitarelli
The Pentagon Wars (1998)
The Wonderful World of Disney (1995–2005)– They contributed an episode in the series.
Laughter on the 23rd Floor (2001)
The Sports Pages (2001)
Alan Silvestri
My Stepmother is an Alien (1988)
Downtown (1990)

Robert Benton

Howard Shore
Places in the Heart (1984) - Shore was credited as additional music producer.
Nadine (1987)
Nobody's Fool (1994)
John Kander
Kramer vs. Kramer (1979)
Still of the Night (1982)
Places in the Heart (1984)
Billy Bathgate (1991) Rejected Score
Harvey Schmidt
A Texas Romance, 1909 (1964)
 Bad Company (1972)
Stephen Trask
The Human Stain (2003)
Feast of Love (2007)

Bruce Beresford

Peter Best
The Adventures of Barry McKenzie (1972)
Barry McKenzie Holds His Own (1974)
Stephen Endelman
Bride of the Wind (2001)
Evelyn (2002)
Georges Delerue
Crimes of the Heart (1986)
Her Alibi (1989)
Mister Johnson (1990)
Black Robe (1991)
Rich in Love (1993)
George Dreyfus
Tender Mercies (1983)
The Fringe Dwellers (1986)
Christopher Gordon
Sydney – A Story of a City (1999)
Mao's Last Dancer (2009)
John Debney
Bonnie & Clyde (2013)
Flint (2017)
Mark Isham
Last Dance (1996)
Mr. Church (2016)
Normand Corbeil
Double Jeopardy (1999)
The Contract (2006)

Peter Berg
Steve Jablonsky
Battleship (2012)
Lone Survivor (2013)
Deepwater Horizon (2016)
Spenser Confidential (2020)
Ingmar Bergman

Erlan von Koch
Crisis (1946)
It Rains on Our Love (1946)
A Ship Bound for India (1947)
Music in Darkness (1948)
Port of Call (1948)
Prison (1949)
Erik Nordgren
Thirst (1949)
This Can't Happen Here (1950)
Summer Interlude (1951)
Waiting Women (1952)
Summer with Monika (1953)
Smiles of a Summer Night (1955)
The Seventh Seal (1957)
Wild Strawberries (1957)
Ansiktet (1958)
The Virgin Spring (1960)
The Devil's Eye (1960)
Through A Glass Darkly (1961)

Andrew Bergman
David Newman
The Freshman (1990)
Honeymoon in Vegas (1992)
Bernardo Bertolucci
Ryuichi Sakamoto
The Last Emperor (1987)
The Sheltering Sky (1990)
Little Buddha (1993)
Bibo Bergeron
Hans Zimmer
The Road to El Dorado (2000)
Shark Tale (2004)
Luc Besson
Éric Serra
Le Dernier Combat (1983)
Subway (1985)
Le Grand Bleu (1988) - Rejected Score
Nikita (1990)
Atlantis (1991)
Léon (1994)
The Fifth Element (1997)
Messenger: The Story of Joan of Arc (1999)
Arthur and the Minimoys (2006)
Arthur and the Revenge of Maltazard (2009)
Arthur 3: The War of the Two Worlds (2010)
The Extraordinary Adventures of Adèle Blanc-Sec (2010)
The Lady (2011)
Lucy (2014)
Anna (2019)
Bahram Beyzai

Babak Bayat
Death of Yazdgerd (1981)
Maybe Some Other Time (1988)
Travelers (1992)
Mohammad-Reza Darvishi
The Eloquent Carpet (2006)
When We Are All Asleep (2009)

Thomas Bezucha
Michael Giacchino
The Family Stone (2005)
Monte Carlo (2011)
Let Him Go (2020)
Tony Bill

Cliff Eidelman
Crazy People (1990)
Untamed Heart (1993)
Van Dyke Parks
Next Door (1994)
One Christmas (1994)
Oliver Twist (1997)
A Chance of Snow (1998)
Harlan County War (2000)

Mike Binder
Miles Goodman
Indian Summer (1993)
Blankman (1994)
Brad Bird
Michael Giacchino
The Incredibles (2004)
Ratatouille (2007)
Mission: Impossible – Ghost Protocol (2011)
Tomorrowland (2015)
Incredibles 2 (2018)
Shane Black

John Ottman
Kiss Kiss Bang Bang (2005)
The Nice Guys (2016)
Brian Tyler
Iron Man 3 (2013)
Edge (2015)

Don Bluth

Robert F. Brunner
The Small One (1978)
Banjo the Woodpile Cat (1979)
Stephen Flaherty
Anastasia (1997) He wrote many of the songs, while David Newman composed the score.
Bartok the Magnificent (1999)
Robert Folk
Rock-a-Doodle (1991)
A Troll in Central Park (1994)
James Horner
An American Tail (1986)
The Land Before Time (1988)
Mark Watters
Thumbelina (1994) – Watters is an uncredited orchestrator.
The Pebble and the Penguin (1995)

James Bobin
Christophe Beck
The Muppets (2011)
Muppets Most Wanted (2014)
Paul Bogart
Arthur B. Rubinstein
The House Without a Christmas Tree (1972)
Look Homeward, Angel (1972)
The Thanksgiving Treasure (1973)
The Easter Promise (1975)
You Can't Take It with You (1979)
David Shire
Skin Game (1971) 
Class of '44 (1973)
Tell Me Where It Hurts (1974)
Winner Takes All (1975)
Oh, God! You Devil (1984)
Broadway Bound (1992)
The Heidi Chronicles (1995)
Mauro Bolognini
Ennio Morricone
Le streghe (1967)
Arabella (1967)
L'assoluto naturale (1969)
Un bellissimo novembre (1969)
Metello (1970)
Chronicle of a Homicide (1972)
Drama of the Rich (1974)
Libera, My Love (1975)
Down the Ancient Staircase (1975)
The Inheritance (1976)
Where Are You Going on Holiday? (1978)
The Lady of the Camellias (1980)
The Venetian Woman (1986)
Farewell Moscow (1987)
Gli indifferenti (1987)
Husband and Lovers (1991)
Uwe Boll
Jessica de Rooij
Seed (2007)
In the Name of the King: A Dungeon Siege Tale (2007)
Postal (2007)
BloodRayne 2: Deliverance (2007)
1968 Tunnel Rats (2008)
Rampage (2009)
Darfur (2009)
Max Schmeling (2010)
Auschwitz (2011)
BloodRayne: The Third Reich (2011)
Blubberella (2011)
In the Name of the King 2: Two Worlds (2011)
Assault on Wall Street (2013)
In the Name of the King 3: The Last Job (2014)
Capital Punishment (2014)
Rampage: President Down (2016)
Jan de Bont
Mark Mancina
Speed (1994)
Twister (1996)
Speed 2: Cruise Control (1997)
Josh Boone
Mike Mogis & Nate Walcott
Stuck in Love. (2012)
The Fault in Our Stars (2014)
The New Mutants (2020)
Ole Bornedal

Marco Beltrami
Nightwatch (Remake) (1997) – additional music/music producer
Mimic (1997) – Produced by
Dybt vand (English: "Deep Water") (1999)
Jeg er Dina (English: "I Am Dina") (2002)
Vikaren (English: "The Substitute") (2007)
1864 (2014)
Skyggen I Mit Øje (English: "The Shadow in My Eye") (2021)
 Joachim Holbek
Nattevagten (English: "Nightwatch") (1994)
Charlot og Charlotte (English: "Charlot & Charlotte") (1996)
Nightwatch (Remake) (1997) with Amjad Albasel
Just Another Love Story (2007)
Dræberne fra Nibe (English: "Small Town Killers") (2017)
Sa Laenge Jeg Lever (English: "Road to Mandalay") (2018)

Boulting Brothers
John Addison
Seven Days to Noon (1950)
High Treason (1951)
Josephine and Men (1955)
Private's Progress (1956)
Lucky Jim (1957)
Carlton-Browne of the F.O. (1959)
A French Mistress (1960)
Serge Bourguignon
Maurice Jarre
Sundays and Cybele (1962)
Mon Royaume Pour un Cheval (1978) 
David Bowers
Edward Shearmur
Diary of a Wimpy Kid: Rodrick Rules (2011)
Diary of a Wimpy Kid: Dog Days (2012)
Diary of a Wimpy Kid: The Long Haul (2017)
Danny Boyle

John Murphy
Strumpet (2001)
Vacuuming Completely Nude in Paradise (2001)
28 Days Later (2002)
Millions (2004)
Sunshine (2007)
Daniel Pemberton
Steve Jobs (2015)
Yesterday (2019)
A. R. Rahman
Slumdog Millionaire (2008)
127 Hours (2010)

John Brahm

David Buttolph
Bomber's Moon (1943)
The Brasher Dubloon (1947)
Hugo Friedhofer
The Lodger (1944)
Face to Face (1952)
Emil Newman
The Undying Monster (1942)
Tonight We Raid Calais (1943)
The Mad Magician (1954)
Karol Rathaus
Broken Blossoms (1936)
Let Us Live (1939)
Morris Stoloff
Counsel for Crime (1937)
Penitentiary (1938)

Kenneth Branagh
Patrick Doyle
Henry V (1989)
Dead Again (1991)
Much Ado About Nothing (1993)
Mary Shelley's Frankenstein (1994)
Hamlet (1996)
Love's Labour's Lost (2000)
As You Like It (2006)
Sleuth (2007)
Thor (2011)
Jack Ryan: Shadow Recruit (2014)
Cinderella (2015)
Murder on the Orient Express (2017)
All is True (2018)
Artemis Fowl (2019)
Death on the Nile (2022)
Martin Brest
Thomas Newman
Scent of a Woman (1992)
Josh and S.A.M. (1993) - Produced by
Meet Joe Black (1998)
Craig Brewer
Scott Bomar
Hustle & Flow (2005)
Black Snake Moan (2006)
Dolemite Is My Name (2019)
Steven Brill
Christophe Beck
Without a Paddle (2004)
Drillbit Taylor (2008)
Movie 43 (2013) Segments "The Thread" (Alternative version) and "iBabe"
Marshall BrickmanPhilippe Sarde
Lovesick (1983)
The Manhattan Project (1986)
Sister Mary Explains It All (2001)Philippe De Broca 
Georges Delerue
The Love Game (1960) 
The Joker (1960) 
Five Day Lover (1961) 
Swords of Blood (1962)
That Man From Rio (1964) 
Male Companion (1964)
Up to His Ears (1965)
King of Hearts (1966)
The Devil by the Tail (1969) 
Give Her the Moon (1970) 
Dear Louise (1972)
Incorrigible (1975)
Julie Gluepot (1977)
Dear Inspector (1977) 
Le cavaleur (1979)
L'Africain (1983)
Chouans! (1988)James L. BrooksAlf Clausen
The Simpsons (1990–2017) - Executive Producer
The Critic (1994–1995) - Executive Producer
Richard Gibbs
The Tracey Ullman Show (1987–1990) - Executive Producer
The Simpsons (1989–1990) - Executive Producer
Michael Gore
Terms of Endearment (1983)
Broadcast News (1987) - additional music
Hans Zimmer
I'll Do Anything (1994)
The Critic (1994–1995) - Executive Producer
As Good as It Gets (1997)
Riding in Cars with Boys (2001) - Produced by
Spanglish (2004)
The Simpsons Movie (2007) - Produced by
How Do You Know (2010)
The Longest Daycare (2012) - Produced by
The Simpsons (2017–present) - Executive Producer/Score ProducerMel BrooksHummie Mann
Robin Hood: Men in Tights (1993)
Dracula: Dead and Loving It (1995)
John Morris
The Producers (1968)
The Twelve Chairs (1970)
Young Frankenstein (1974)
Blazing Saddles (1974)
Silent Movie (1976)
High Anxiety (1977)
The Elephant Man (1980) - Produced by
History of the World, Part I (1981)
To Be or Not to Be  (1983)
Spaceballs (1987)
Life Stinks (1991)Richard BrooksQuincy Jones
In Cold Blood (1967)
Dollars (1971)
Fever Pitch (1985) - Music Producer
Miklós Rózsa
Crisis (1950)
The Light Touch (1952)
Something of Value (1957)
Artie Kane
Looking for Mr. Goodbar (1977)
Wrong Is Right (1982)Clarence BrownHerbert Stothart
The Son-Daughter (1932)
Night Flight (1933)
Chained (1934)
Anna Karenina (1935)
Ah, Wilderness! (1935)
Wife vs. Secretary (1936)
The Gorgeous Hussy (1936)
Conquest (1937)
Of Human Hearts (1938)
Idiot's Delight (1939)
Edison, the Man (1940)
They Met in Bombay (1941)
Come Live with Me (1941)
The Human Comedy (1943)
The White Cliffs of Dover (1944)
National Velvet (1944) 
The Yearling (1946)Chris BuckChristophe Beck
Frozen (2013)
Frozen Fever (2015)
Frozen 2 (2019)John Carl BuechlerRichard Band
Troll (1986)
Cellar Dweller (1988)Luis BuñuelRaúl Lavista
Susana (1951)
A Woman Without Love (1952)
El bruto (1953)
Wuthering Heights (1953)
The River and Death (1954)
The Exterminating Angel (1962)
Simon of the Desert (1965) (short film)Charles BurnettStephen James Taylor
To Sleep with Anger (1990)
The Glass Shield (1994)
When It Rains (1995 short film)
Nightjohn (1996)
The Wedding (1998)
Selma, Lord, Selma (1999)
Olivia's Story (2000 short film)
Finding Buck McHenry (2000)
The Blues (2003) — They collaborated on an episode
Namibia: The Struggle for Liberation (2007)
Power to Heal: Medicare and the Civil Rights Revolution (2018)Jeff BurrRichard Band
Puppet Master 4 (1994)
Puppet Master 5: The Final Chapter (1994)
Jim Manzie
From a Whisper to a Scream (1987)
Stepfather II (1989)
Leatherface: The Texas Chainsaw Massacre III (1990)
Pumpkinhead II: Blood Wings (1994)
Night of the Scarecrow (1995)Tim BurtonDavid Newman
Frankenweenie (1984) Short
Faerie Tale Theatre (1986) Episode: "Aladdin and His Wonderful Lamp"
Danny Elfman
Pee-Wee's Big Adventure (1985)
Alfred Hitchcock Presents (1986) Episode "The Jar"
Beetlejuice (1988)
Batman (1989)
Edward Scissorhands (1990)
Batman Returns (1992)
The Nightmare Before Christmas (1993) - Produced by
Mars Attacks! (1996)
Sleepy Hollow (1999)
Stainboy (2000-2001) with Jason Wells.
Planet of the Apes (2001)
Big Fish (2003)
Charlie and the Chocolate Factory (2005)
Corpse Bride (2005) (Mike Johnson served as co-director).
Alice in Wonderland (2010)
Dark Shadows (2012)
Frankenweenie (2012)
Big Eyes (2014)
Alice Through the Looking Glass (2016) – Produced by
Dumbo (2019)
Wednesday (2022)Gina Prince-BythewoodTerence Blanchard
Love & Basketball (2000)
The Woman King (2022)
Mark Isham
The Secret Life of Bees (2008)
Beyond the Lights (2014)

 C Edward L. CahnPaul Dunlap
The Four Skulls of Jonathan Drake (1959)
Invisible Invaders (1959)
Gunfighters of Abilene (1960)
Three Hours to Kill (1960)
Irving Gertz
Destination Murder (1950)
Experiment Alcatraz (1950)
Two-Dollar Bettor (1951)
Albert Glasser
Motorcycle Gang (1957)
Oklahoma Territory (1960)
Edward J. Kay
The Checkered Coat (1948)
I Cheated the Law (1949)
The Great Plane Robbery (1950)
Richard LaSalle
Boy Who Caught a Crook (1961)
When the Clock Strikes (1961)
You Have to Run Fast (1961)
Secret of Deep Harbor (1961)
Gun Street (1961)
The Clown and the Kid (1961)
Incident in an Alley (1962)
Emil Newman
Hong Kong Confidential (1958)
Riot in Juvenile Prison (1959)
Paul Sawtell & Bert Shefter
It! The Terror from Beyond Space (1958)
Pier 5, Havana (1959)
A Dog's Best Friend (1959)
Vice Raid (1960)
Cage of Evil (1960)
The Music Box Kid (1960)
Noose for a Gunman (1960)
Three Came to Kill (1960)
The Walking Target (1960)
Frontier Uprising (1961)
Five Guns to Tombstone (1961)
The Police Dog Story (1961)
Operation Bottleneck (1961)
Gun Fight (1961)
The Gambler Wore a Gun (1961)
David Snell
The Omaha Trail (1942)
Dangerous Partners (1945)
Ronald Stein
Girls in Prison (1956)
The She-Creature (1956)
Shake, Rattle & Rock! (1956)
Runaway Daughters (1956)
Flesh and the Spur (1956)
Dragstrip Girl (1957)
Invasion of the Saucer Men (1957)
Jet Attack (1958)
Suicide Battalion (1958)Christopher CainSteve Dorff
Pure Country (1992)
Rose Hill (1997)
A Father's Choice (2000)
Pure Country 2: The Gift (2010)
James Horner
The Stone Boy (1984)
Where the River Runs Black (1986)
Young Guns (1988) Rejected Score 
William Ross
The Amazing Panda Adventure (1995)
September Dawn (2007)James CameronBrad Fiedel
The Terminator (1984)
Terminator 2: Judgment Day (1991)
True Lies (1994)
James Horner
Aliens (1986)
Titanic (1997)
Avatar (2009)Joe CampEuel Box
Benji (1974) with Betty E. Box
Hawmps! (1976) 
For the Love of Benji (1977) 
The Phenomenon of Benji (1978)
Benji's Very Own Christmas Story (1978) - TV Special
The Double McGuffin (1979)
Oh Heavenly Dog (1980)
Benji Takes a Dive at Marineland (1981)
Benji, Zax & the Alien Prince (1983) 
Benji the Hunted (1987) with Betty E. BoxMartin CampbellJames Horner
 The Mask of Zorro (1998)
 Beyond Borders (2003)
 The Legend of Zorro (2005)
James Newton Howard 
Vertical Limit (2000)
Green Lantern (2011)Danny CannonGraeme Revell 
Phoenix (1998)
Goal! The Dream Begins (2005)
Eleventh Hour (2008)
The Forgotten (2009)
Dark Blue (2009)
Gotham (2014)Frank CapraMischa Bakaleinikoff
The Younger Generation (1929)
Ladies of Leisure (1930)
American Madness (1932)
Howard Jackson
Lady for a Day (1933)
It Happened One Night (1934)
Broadway Bill (1934)
Mr. Deeds Goes to Town (1936)
Dimitri Tiomkin
Lost Horizon (1937)
You Can't Take It with You (1938)
Mr. Smith Goes to Washington (1939)
Meet John Doe (1941)
The Nazis Strike (1943) - Short
The Battle of Russia (1943) 
Divide and Conquer (1943) - Music Supervisor
The Battle of China (1944) 
Two Down and One to Go (1945) - Short
War Comes to America (1945) - Short
Know Your Enemy - Japan (1945) - Short
Here Is Germany (1945) - Short
It's a Wonderful Life (1946)
Victor Young
State of the Union (1948)
Riding High (1950)
Max Steiner
Divide and Conquer (1943) - Short
Arsenic and Old Lace (1944)Niki CaroHarry Gregson-Williams
The Zookeeper's Wife (2017)
Mulan (2020)J.S. CardoneJohnny Lee Schell
Black Day Blue Night (1995) with Joe Sublett
Outside Ozona (1998) with Taj Mahal
The Forsaken (2001) with Tim Jones
The Scare Hole (2004)
Tim Jones
The Forsaken (2001) with Johnny Lee Schell
True Blue (2001) 
8mm 2 (2005)
Wicked Little Things (2006)
Robert Folk
The Slayer (1982)
Thunder Alley (1985)
Shadowzone (1990)
A Climate for Killing (1991)
Shadowhunter (1993)John CarpenterHimself
Dark Star (1974)
Assault on Precinct 13 (1976)
Halloween (1978)
The Fog (1980)
Escape from New York (1981) With Alan Howarth.
Halloween II (1981) With Alan Howarth. - Produced by
Halloween III: Season of the Witch (1982) With Alan Howarth. – Produced by
Christine (1983) With Alan Howarth.
Big Trouble in Little China (1986) With Alan Howarth.
Prince of Darkness (1987) With Alan Howarth.
They Live (1988) With Alan Howarth.
Body Bags (1993) With Jim Lang.
In the Mouth of Madness (1994) With Jim Lang.
Village of the Damned (1995) With Dave Davies.
Escape from L.A. (1996) With Shirley Walker.
Vampires (1998)
Ghosts of Mars (2001)
Shirley Walker
Memoirs of an Invisible Man (1992)
Escape from L.A. (1996) With John Carpenter.D.J. CarusoBrian Tyler
Eagle Eye (2008)
Standing Up (2013)
The Disappointments Room (2016)
xXx: The Return of Xander Cage (2017)
Redeeming Love (2021)John CassavetesBill Conti
Gloria (1980)
Big Trouble (1986)
Bo Harwood
A Woman Under the Influence (1974)
The Killing of a Chinese Bookie (1976)
Opening Night (1977)
Love Streams (1984)Nick CassavetesAaron Zigman
John Q. (2002)
The Notebook (2004)
Alpha Dog (2006)
My Sister's Keeper (2009)
Yellow (2012)
The Other Woman (2014)
God Is a Bullet (2023)Enzo G. CastellariGuido De Angelis & Maurizio De Angelis
Sting of the West (1972)
High Crime (1973)
Street Law (1974)
Cipolla Colt (1975)
The Big Racket (1976)
Keoma (1976)
The House by the Edge of the Lake (1979)
The Shark Hunter (1979)
The Last Shark (1981)
Light Blast (1985)
The Return of Sandokan (1996)
Francesco De Masi
Renegade Riders (1967)
Any Gun Can Play (1968)
Johnny Hamlet (1968)
Kill Them All and Come Back Alone (1968)
Eagles Over London (1969)
Hector the Mighty (1972)
The Inglorious Bastards (1978)
Escape from the Bronx (1983)
Eagles Over London (1969)
Claudio Simonetti
The Heroin Busters (1977)
Warriors of the Wasteland (1983)Nick CastleCraig Safan
Tag: The Assassination Game (1982)
The Last Starfighter (1984)
Shangri-La Plaza (1991)
Major Payne (1995)
Mr. Wrong (1996)
Delivering Milo (2001)
'Twas the Night (2001)William CastleVan Alexander
13 Frightened Girls (1963)
Strait-Jacket (1964)
I Saw What You Did (1965)
Vic Mizzy
The Night Walker (1964)
The Busy Body (1967)
The Spirit Is Willing (1967)
Von Dexter
House on Haunted Hill (1959)
The Tingler (1959)
13 Ghosts (1960)
Mr. Sardonicus (1961)Gilbert CatesAl Gorgoni
I Never Sang for My Father (1970)
To All My Friends on Shore (1972) – Music Supervisor
Charles Fox
The Last Married Couple in America (1980)
Oh, God! Book II (1980)
Absolute Strangers (1991)
Confessions: Two Faces of Evil (1994)
Innocent Victims (1996)
A Death in the Family (2001)
Collected Stories (2002)
Robert Drasnin
Country Girl (1982) – Music Supervisor
Hudson's Choice (1983)
The Twilight Zone (1985) Segment Episode: "Teacher's Aide"Larry CharlesErran Baron Cohen
Borat: Cultural Learnings of America for Make Benefit Glorious Nation of Kazakhstan (2006)
Brüno (2009)
The Dictator (2012)Michael ChavesJoseph Bishara
The Curse of La Llorona (2019)
The Conjuring: The Devil Made Me Do It (2021)Damien ChazelleJustin Hurwitz
Guy and Madeline on a Park Bench (2009)
Whiplash (2014)
La La Land (2016)
First Man (2018)
Babylon (2022)Peter ChelsomJohn Altman
Hear My Song (1991)
Funny Bones (1995)
Shall We Dance (2004)Roger ChristianTrevor Jones
Black Angel (1980)
The Dollar Bottom (1981)
The Sender (1982)
Anthony Marinelli
Underworld (1996)
Masterminds (1997)Jon M. ChuBrian Tyler
Now You See Me 2 (2016)
Crazy Rich Asians (2018)Michael CiminoDavid Mansfield
Heaven's Gate (1980)
Year of the Dragon (1985)
The Sicilian (1987)
Desperate Hours (1990)Bob ClarkPaul Zaza
Murder By Decree (1979) with Carl Zittrer
Porky's (1982) with Carl Zittrer
A Christmas Story (1983) with Carl Zittrer
Turk 182! (1985)
From the Hip (1987)
Loose Cannons (1990)
It Runs in the Family (1994)
Fudge-a-Mania (1995)
Derby (1995)
Stolen Memories: Secrets from the Rose Garden (1996)
Baby Geniuses (1999)
I'll Remember April (1999)
Now & Forever (2002)
Superbabies: Baby Geniuses 2 (2004)
The Karate Dog (2005)
Carl Zittrer
Children Shouldn't Play with Dead Things (1972)
Deathdream (1974)
Black Christmas (1974)
Murder By Decree (1979) with Paul Zaza
Porky's (1982) with Paul Zaza
Porky's II: The Next Day (1983)
A Christmas Story (1983) with Paul ZazaJack ClaytonGeorges Auric
The Bespoke Overcoat (1955)
The Innocents (1961)
Georges Delerue
The Pumpkin Eater (1964)
Our Mother's House (1967)
Something Wicked This Way Comes (1983) Rejected Score
The Lonely Passion of Judith Hearne (1987)
BBC Screen Two (1985–2002) – They contributed one of the episodes.Ron Clements & John MuskerAlan Menken
The Little Mermaid (1989)
Aladdin (1992)
Hercules (1997)Graeme CliffordCharles Bernstein
Crossing the Line (2002)
Profoundly Normal (2003)
Family Sins (2004)
John Barry
Frances (1982)
Ruby Cairo (1992)
Roger Bellon
The Last Don (1997)
The Last Don II (1998)
My Husband's Secret Life (1998)
Jonathan Grossman
Joan of Arcadia (2003–2005) – They collaborated on two episodes.
Write & Wrong (2007) with David Schwartz.George ClooneyAlexandre Desplat
The Ides of March (2011)
Argo (2012) – Produced by
The Monuments Men (2014)
Suburbicon (2017)
The Midnight Sky (2020)Jean CocteauGeorges Auric
The Blood of a Poet (1930)
Beauty and the Beast (1946)
The Eagle with Two Heads (1948)
Les Parents terribles (1948)
Orpheus (1950)
Testament of Orpheus (1960) with Martial SolalCoen BrothersCarter Burwell
Blood Simple (1984)
Raising Arizona (1987)
Miller's Crossing (1990)
Barton Fink (1991)
The Hudsucker Proxy (1994)
Fargo (1996)
The Big Lebowski (1998)
O Brother, Where Art Thou? (2000) - additional music
The Man Who Wasn't There (2001)
Intolerable Cruelty (2003)
The Ladykillers (2004)
No Country for Old Men (2007)
Burn After Reading (2008)
A Serious Man (2009)
True Grit (2010)
Hail, Caesar! (2016)
The Ballad of Buster Scruggs (2018)
The Tragedy of Macbeth (2021)
T Bone Burnett
The Big Lebowski (1998) - musical archivist/music arranger.
O Brother, Where Art Thou? (2000) - arranger/music producer/original music. 
The Ladykillers (2004) - arranger/music producer.
Inside Llewyn Davis (2013) - arranger/music producer.
The Ballad of Buster Scruggs (2018) - music producer.Pierre CoffinHeitor Pereira
Despicable Me (2010)
Despicable Me 2 (2013)
Minions (2015)
Despicable Me 3 (2017)Larry CohenJay Chattaway
The Ambulance (1990)
Masters of Horror (2005-2007) They collaborate on one episode.
Bernard Herrmann
It's Alive (1974)
It Lives Again (1978)
Michael Minard
Special Effects (1984)
A Return to Salem's Lot (1987)
Robert O. Ragland
God Told Me To (1976)
Q (1982)Etan CohenChristophe Beck
Get Hard (2015)
Holmes and Watson (2018)Rob CohenJohn Debney
The Mummy: Tomb of the Dragon Emperor (2008) - additional music
Alex Cross (2012)
BT
The Fast and the Furious (2001)
Stealth (2005)
Randy Edelman
Dragon: The Bruce Lee Story (1993)
Dragonheart (1996)
Daylight (1996)
The Skulls (2000)
xXx (2002)
Stealth (2005) - Rejected score
The Mummy: Tomb of the Dragon Emperor (2008)
The Boy Next Door (2015)Chris ColumbusJohn Williams
Home Alone (1990)
Home Alone 2: Lost in New York (1992)
Stepmom (1998)
Harry Potter and the Philosopher's Stone (2001)
Harry Potter and the Chamber of Secrets (2002)
Harry Potter and the Prisoner of Azkaban (2004) - Produced by
Christophe Beck
I Love You, Beth Cooper (2009)
Percy Jackson & the Olympians: The Lightning Thief (2010)
The Christmas Chronicles (2018) – Produced by
The Christmas Chronicles 2 (2020)Bill CondonCarter Burwell
Gods and Monsters (1998)
Kinsey (2004)
The Twilight Saga: Breaking Dawn – Part 1 (2011)
The Twilight Saga: Breaking Dawn – Part 2 (2012)
The Fifth Estate  (2013)
Mr. Holmes (2015)
The Good Liar (2019)
Philip Giffin
White Lie (1991)
Red Wind (1991)
Dead in the Water (1991)
Murder 101 (1991)
Deadly Relations (1993)Jack ConwayHerbert Stothart
Viva Villa! (1934)
A Tale of Two Cities (1935)
Dragon Seed (1944)
High Barbee (1947)
Desire Me (1947)James L. ConwayBob Summers
In Search of Noah's Ark (1976)
The Life and Times of Grizzly Adams (1977 to 1978)
The Lincoln Conspiracy (1977)
Last of The Mohicans (1977)
Incredible Rocky Mountain Race (1977)
Beyond and Back (1978)
Donner Pass: The Road to Survival (1978)
Greatest Heroes of The Bible (1978 to 1979)
The Fall of the House of Usher (1979)
Hangar 18 (1980)
Earthbound (1981)
The Boogens (1981)
The Nashville Grab (1981)
The President Must Die (1981)Ryan CooglerLudwig Göransson
Locks (2009) Short
Fig (2011) Short
Fruitvale Station (2013)
Creed (2015)
Black Panther (2018)
Black Panther: Wakanda Forever (2022)Martha CoolidgeDavid Newman
Out to Sea (1997)
The Flamingo Rising (2001)
Elmer Bernstein
Rambling Rose (1991)
Lost in Yonkers (1993)
Introducing Dorothy Dandridge (1999)
Jennie Muskett
The Prince & Me (2004)
The Twelve Days of Christmas Eve (2004)
Material Girls (2006)
An American Girl: Chrissa Stands Strong (2009)
I'll Find You (2019) - additional music
Cynthia Millar
Crazy in Love (1992)
Three Wishes (1995)
Marc Levinthal
Valley Girl (1983) with Scott Wilk.
City Girl (1984) with Scott Wilk.
Scott Wilk
Valley Girl (1983) with Marc Levinthal.
City Girl (1984) with Marc Levinthal.
Plain Clothes (1988)
Bare Essentials (1991)Francis Ford CoppolaJohn Barry
Hammett (1982) - Produced by
The Cotton Club (1984)
Peggy Sue Got Married (1986)
Carmine Coppola
Tonight for Sure (1962)
The Godfather Part II (1974) - additional music
Apocalypse Now (1979)
The Outsiders (1983)
Gardens of Stone (1987)
Tucker: The Man and His Dream (1988) - additional music
New York Stories (1989)
The Godfather Part III (1990)
Osvaldo Golijov
Youth Without Youth (2007)
Tetro (2009) 
Twixt (2011)
Nino Rota
The Godfather (1972)
The Godfather Part II (1974)
David Shire
The Conversation (1974)
Apocalypse Now (1979) Rejected ScoreSofia CoppolaPhoenix
Somewhere (2010)
The Begiled (2017)
On the Rocks (2020)Frank CoraciRupert Gregson-Williams
Click (2006)
Zookeeper (2011)
Here Comes the Boom (2012)
Blended (2014)
The Ridiculous 6 (2015)
Hot Air (2018) 
Alan Pasqua
Murdered Innocence (1995)
The Waterboy (1998)Roger CormanLes Baxter
House of Usher (1960)
Pit and the Pendulum (1961)
Tales of Terror (1962)
The Young Racers (1963)
The Raven (1963)
X: The Man with the X-Ray Eyes (1963) 
Target: Harry (1969)
Gerald Fried
Machine Gun Kelly (1958)
I Mobster (1958)
Albert Glasser
The Saga of the Viking Women and Their Voyage to the Waters of the Great Sea Serpent (1957)
Teenage Caveman (1958) 
Walter Greene
Teenage Doll (1957)
Carnival Rock (1957) 
War of the Satellites (1958)
Fred Katz
A Bucket of Blood (1959)
The Wasp Woman (1959)
Ski Troop Attack (1960)
The Little Shop of Horrors (1960) 
Creature from the Haunted Sea (1961)
Ronald Stein
Apache Woman (1955)
Day the World Ended (1955) 
The Oklahoma Woman (1956)
Gunslinger (1956)
It Conquered the World (1956)
Naked Paradise (1957)
Not of This Earth (1957)
Attack of the Crab Monsters (1957)
The Undead (1957)
Rock All Night (1957) - Stock Music
Sorority Girl (1957)
She Gods of Shark Reef (1958)
Last Woman on Earth (1960)
Atlas (1961) 
The Premature Burial (1962)
The Terror (1963)
The Haunted Palace (1963)Don CoscarelliFred Myrow
Jim, the World's Greatest (1975)
Kenny & Company (1977)
Phantasm (1979)
Phantasm II (1988) with Christopher L. Stone 
Survival Quest (1988) with Christopher L. Stone
Phantasm III: Lord of the Dead (1994) with Christopher L. Stone
Christopher L. Stone
Phantasm II (1988) with Fred Myrow
Survival Quest (1988) with Fred Myrow
Phantasm III: Lord of the Dead (1994) with Fred Myrow
Phantasm IV: Oblivion (1998)
Masters of Horror (2005) - They collaborated on an episode. 
Phantasm: Ravager (2016) - Produced By
Brian Tyler
Bubba Ho-Tep (2002)
John Dies at the End (2012)George P. CosmatosBruce Broughton
Tombstone (1993)
Shadow Conspiracy (1997)
Jerry Goldsmith
The Cassandra Crossing (1976)
Rambo: First Blood Part II (1985)
Leviathan (1989)Alex CoxPray for Rain
Sid and Nancy (1986)
Straight to Hell (1986)
Death and the Compass (1992)
Three Businessmen (1998)
Kurosawa: The Last Emperor (1999)
Emmanuelle: A Hard Look (2000)
Shiritsu tantei Hama Maiku (2002) - They were both involved with this TV series. 
Searchers 2.0 (2007)
Repo Chick (2009)
Tombstone-Rashomon (2017)Wes CravenMarco Beltrami
Scream (1996)
Scream 2 (1997)
Dracula 2000 (2000) – Executive Producer
Scream 3 (2000)
Cursed (2005)
Red Eye (2005)
My Soul to Take (2010)
Scream 4 (2011)
Charles Bernstein
A Nightmare on Elm Street (1984)
Deadly Friend (1986)
The Serpent and the Rainbow (1988) Rejected Score
Harry Manfredini
Swamp Thing (1982)
The Hills Have Eyes Part II (1985)
Don Peake
The Hills Have Eyes (1977)
The People Under The Stairs (1991) With Graeme Revell.
J. Peter Robinson
Nightmare Cafe (1992) They contributed an episode to the series.
Wes Craven's New Nightmare (1994)
Vampire in Brooklyn (1995)
Brad Fiedel
The Serpent and the Rainbow (1988)
Night Visions (1990)Destin Daniel CrettonJoel P. West
I Am Not a Hipster (2012)
Short Term 12 (2013)
The Glass Castle (2017)
Shang-Chi and the Legend of the Ten Rings (2021)Michael CrichtonJerry Goldsmith
Pursuit (1972)
Coma (1978)
The First Great Train Robbery (1978)
Runaway (1984)
The 13th Warrior (1999) - Produced byJohn CromwellMax Steiner
Ann Vickers (1933)
Double Harness (1933)
The Silver Cord (1933)
Sweepings (1933)
The Fountain (1934)
Of Human Bondage (1934)
Spitfire (1934)
The Man Is Mine (1934)
I Dream Too Much (1935)
Little Lord Fauntleroy (1936)
Since You Went Away (1944)
Caged (1950)David CronenbergFred Mollin
Fast Company (1979)
Friday the 13th: The Series (1987) Episode: "Faith Healer"
Howard Shore
The Brood (1979)
Scanners (1981)
Videodrome (1983)
The Fly (1986)
Dead Ringers (1988)
Naked Lunch (1991)
Scales of Justice (1992–1993)
M. Butterfly (1993)
Crash (1996)
Existenz (1999)
Camera (2000) Short
Spider (2002)
A History of Violence (2005)
To Each His Own Cinema (2007) - They contributed a segment to the film.
Eastern Promises (2007)
A Dangerous Method (2011)
Cosmopolis (2011)
Maps to the Stars (2014)
Crimes of the Future (2022)Cameron CroweNancy Wilson
Say Anything... (1989) - Wilson composed additional music.
Jerry Maguire (1996) - Wilson composed the theme music.
Almost Famous (2000)
Vanilla Sky (2001)
Elizabethtown (2005)Alfonso CuarónPatrick Doyle
A Little Princess (1995)
Great Expectations (1998)
Steven Price
Gravity (2013)
Believe (2014) Pilot
Roma (2018)George CukorFranz Waxman
The Philadelphia Story (1940)
Her Cardboard Lover (1942)
Max Steiner
A Bill of Divorcement (1932)
Rockabye (1932)
What Price Hollywood? (1932)
Little Women (1933)
Our Betters (1933)
John Barry
Love Among the Ruins (1975)
The Corn is Green (1979)
Miklós Rózsa
A Double Life (1947)
Edward, My Son (1949)
Adam's Rib (1949)
Bhowani Junction (1956)
Friedrich Hollaender
Born Yesterday (1950)
It Should Happen to You (1954)
Herbert Stothart
David Copperfield (1935)
Romeo and Juliet (1936)
Camille (1936)
Susan and God (1936)Sean S. CunninghamLalo Schifrin
A Stranger Is Watching (1982)
The New Kids (1985)
Harry Manfredini
Here Come the Tigers (1978)
Manny's Orphans (1978)
Friday the 13th (1980)
Spring Break (1983)
The New Kids (1985) - Rejected Score
House (1985) - Produced by
House II: The Second Story (1987) - Produced by
The Horror Show (1989) - Produced by
Deepstar Six (1989)
House IV (1992) - Produced by
My Boyfriend's Back (1993) - Produced by
Jason Goes to Hell: The Final Friday (1993) - Produced by
XCU: Extreme Close Up (2001)
Terminal Invasion (2002)
The Thing (2015) - Short film 
The Nurse with the Purple Hair (2017)
The Music Teacher (2019) - Short film Dan CurtisRobert Cobert
Dark Shadows (1966–1971)
House of Dark Shadows (1970)
Night of Dark Shadows (1971)
The Norliss Tapes (1973)
The Night Strangler (1973)
"The Wide World of Mystery"-Frankenstein (1973)
Bram Stoker's Dracula (1974)
The Turn of the Screw (1974)
Scream of the Wolf (1974)
The Picture of Dorian Gray (1974)
Melvin Purvis: G-Man (1974)
The Great Ice Rip-Off (1974)
Trilogy of Terror (1975)
The Kansas City Massacre (1975)
Burnt Offerings (1976)
Curse of the Black Widow (1977)
Dead of Night (1977)
The Last Ride of the Dalton Gang (1979)
Mrs. R's Daughter (1979)
Supertrain (1979) Pilot Episode.
The Winds of War (1983)
St. John in Exile (1986)
War and Remembrance (1988–1989)
Dark Shadows (1991)
Intruders (1992)
Me and the Kid (1993)
Trilogy of Terror II (1996)
The Love Letter (1998)
Our Fathers (2005)
Walter Scharf
When Every Day Was the Fourth of July (1978)
The Long Days of Summer (1980)Michael CurtizIrving Berlin
Mammy (1930)
White Christmas (1954)
Ray Heindorf
Four's a Crowd (1938)
Night and Day (1946)
Romance on the High Seas (1948)
The Jazz Singer (1952) With Max Steiner.
Bernhard Kaun
The Woman from Monte Carlo (1932)
The Strange Love of Molly Louvain (1932)
Doctor X (1932)
20,000 Years in Sing Sing (1932)
Alias the Doctor (1932)
Mystery of the Wax Museum (1932) Kaun composed the end titles.
The Kennel Murder Case (1933)
Private Detective 62 (1933)
Jimmy the Gent (1934)
British Agent (1934)
Black Fury (1935)
The Case of the Curious Bride (1935)
Erich Wolfgang Korngold
Captain Blood (1935)
The Adventures of Robin Hood (1938) William Keighley co-directed the film.
The Private Lives of Elizabeth and Essex (1939)
The Sea Hawk (1940)
The Sea Wolf (1941)
David Mendoza
God's Gift to Women (1931)
The Mad Genius (1931)
Jerome Moross
The Proud Rebel (1958)
The Adventures of Huckleberry Finn (1960)
Heinz Roemheld
Mandalay (1934)
British Agent (1934) With Bernhard Kaun.
Captain Blood (1935)
Little Big Shot (1935)
Front Page Woman (1935)
Kid Galahad (1937) With Max Steiner.
Marked Woman (1937)
Four Mothers (1941)
Yankee Doodle Dandy (1942) With Max Steiner.
Janie (1944)
Max Steiner
The Charge of the Light Brigade (1936)
Kid Galahad (1937) With Heinz Roemheld.
Four Daughters (1938)
Angels with Dirty Faces (1938)
Gold is Where You Find It (1938)
Dodge City (1939)
Daughters Courageous (1939)
Four Wives (1939)
Santa Fe Trail (1940)
Virginia City (1940)
Dive Bomber (1941)
Captains of the Clouds (1942)
Casablanca (1942)
Yankee Doodle Dandy (1942)
Mission to Moscow (1943)
This Is The Army (1943)
Passage to Marseille (1944)
Mildred Pierce (1945)
Night and Day (1946) With Ray Heindorf.
Life with Father (1947)
The Breaking Point (1950)
Force of Arms (1951)
The Jazz Singer (1952) With Ray Heindorf.
The Boy from Oklahoma (1954)
Victor Young
Bright Leaf (1950)
The Story of Will Rogers (1952)
The Vagabond King (1956)

 D Rod DanielMiles Goodman
Teen Wolf (1985)
Carly Mills (1986)
Like Father Like Son (1987)
K-9 (1989)
The Super (1991)Lee DanielsMario Grigorov
Shadowboxer (2005)
Tennessee (2008)
Precious (2009)
The Paperboy (2012)Joe DantePino Donaggio
Piranha (1978)
The Howling (1981)
Jerry Goldsmith
Twilight Zone: The Movie (1983) Segment "It's a Good Life"
Gremlins (1984)
Explorers (1985)
Amazing Stories (1986) Episode "Boo!"
Innerspace (1987)
The 'Burbs (1989)
Gremlins 2: The New Batch (1990)
Matinee (1993)
Small Soldiers (1998)
Looney Tunes: Back in Action (2003)
Ira Newborn
Police Squad! (1982) - They collaborated on two episodes.
Amazon Women on the Moon (1987)
Hummie Mann
Runaway Daughters (1994)
Picture Windows (1994-1995) - They contributed on one episode.
The Second Civil War (1997)
Masters of Horror (2005-2006) Episodes Homecoming and The Screwfly Solution Frank DarabontMark Isham
The Majestic (2001)
The Mist (2007)
Mob City - (2013–2014)
Thomas Newman
The Shawshank Redemption (1994)
The Green Mile (1999)
The Salton Sea (2002) - Produced byJules DassinMiklós Rózsa
Brute Force (1947)
The Naked City (1948) with Frank SkinnerDelmer DavesMax Steiner
A Kiss in the Dark (1949)
The Hanging Tree (1959)
A Summer Place (1959)
Parrish (1961)
Susan Slade (1961)
Rome Adventure (1962)
Spencer's Mountain (1963)
Youngblood Hawke (1964)
George Duning
3:10 to Yuma (1957)
Cowboy (1958)
Franz Waxman
Destination Tokyo (1943)
The Very Thought of You (1944)
Pride of the Marines (1945)
Dark Passage (1947)
Task Force (1949)
Demetrius and the Gladiators (1954)Andrew DavisJames Newton Howard
The Package (1989)
The Fugitive (1993)
A Perfect Murder (1998)
David Michael Frank
Code of Silence (1985)
Above the Law (1988)John A. DavisJohn Debney
Jimmy Neutron: Boy Genius (2001)
The Ant Bully (2006)John DeBelloRick Patterson
Happy Hour (1987)
Return of the Killer Tomatoes (1988)
Killer Tomatoes Strike Back (1990)
Killer Tomatoes Eat France (1992)Dean DeBloisJohn Powell
How to Train Your Dragon (2010)
How to Train Your Dragon 2 (2014)
How to Train Your Dragon: The Hidden World (2019)Claire DenisStuart Staples
The Intruder (2004)
White Material (2009)
Bastards (2013)
Contact (2004)
Let the Sunshine In (2017)
High Life (2018)Philippe de BrocaGeorges Delerue
The Love Game (1960)
The Joker (1960)
Five Day Lover (1961)
Cartouche (1962)
That Man from Rio (1964)
Male Companion (1964)
Up to His Ears (1965)
King of Hearts (1966)
The Devil by the Tail (1969)
Give Her the Moon (1970)
Dear Louise (1972)
Incorrigible (1975)
Julie Gluepot (1977)
Dear Detective (1978)
Practice Makes Perfect (1979)
The African (1983)
Chouans! (1988)Álex de la IglesiaRoque Baños
Muertos de risa (Dying of Laughter, 1999)
La comunidad (Common Wealth, 2000)
800 balas (800 Bullets, 2002)
Crimen ferpecto (Perfect Crime, 2004)
La habitación del niño (The Baby's Room, 2006)
The Oxford Murders (2008)
Balada Triste de Trompeta (The Last Circus, 2010)David DeCoteauHarry Manfredini
Wolves of Wall Street (2002)
House of Usher (2008)
Playing with Fire (2008)
Stem Cell (2009)
1313: Night of the Widow (2011)
1313: Giant Killer Bees (2011)
1313: Wicked Stepbrother (2011)
1313: Action Slash Model (2011)
1313: Boy Crazies (2011)
1313: Haunted Frat (2012)
2: Voodoo Academy (2012)
Snow White: A Deadly Summer (2012)
1313: Cougar Cult (2012)
1313: Bigfoot Island (2012)
1313: Bermuda Triangle (2012)
1313: UFO Invasion (2012)
1313: Hercules Unbound! (2012)
1313: Billy the Kid (2012)
A Halloween Puppy (2012)
Immortal Kiss: Queen of the Night (2012)
Hansel & Gretel: Warriors of Witchcraft (2013)
Bonnie & Clyde: Justified (2013)
Badass Showdown (2013)
90210 Shark Attack (2014)
3 Scream Queens (2014)
666: Kreepy Kerry (2014)
Bigfoot vs. D.B. Cooper (2014)
3 Wicked Witches (2014)
Knock 'em Dead (2014)
Doc Holliday's Revenge (2014)
Devilish Charm (2014)
Sorority Slaughterouse (2015)Alberto De MartinoEnnio Morricone
Dirty Heroes (1967) 
O.K. Connery (1967) 
Roma come Chicago (1968)
The Antichrist (1974) 
Holocaust 2000 (1977) 
Blood Link (1982) Brian De PalmaPino Donaggio
Carrie (1976)
Home Movies (1979)
Dressed to Kill (1980)
Blow Out (1981)
Body Double (1984)
Raising Cain (1992)
Snake Eyes (1998) Rejected Score
Passion (2012)
Domino (2018)
Bernard Herrmann
Sisters (1973)
Obsession (1976)
Ennio Morricone
The Untouchables (1987)
Casualties of War (1989)
Mission to Mars (2000)
Ryuichi Sakamoto
Snake Eyes (1998)
Mission to Mars (2000) Rejected Score
Femme Fatale (2002)Jonathan DemmeRachel Portman
Beloved (1998)
The Truth About Charlie (2002)
The Manchurian Candidate (2004)
Howard Shore
The Silence of the Lambs (1991)
Philadelphia (1993)
That Thing You Do! (1996) - Produced byTed DemmeDavid A. Stewart
The Ref (1994)
Beautiful Girls (1996)Farid Dms DebahYassine Dms Debah
Venin mortel (1996)
Art'n Acte Production (2003)James DeMonacoNathan Whitehead
The Purge (2013)
The Purge: Anarchy (2014)
The Purge: Election Year (2016)
Once Upon a Time in Staten Island (2020)Jacques DemyMichel Legrand
Lola (1961)
The Seven Deadly Sins (1962) - They collaborated on a segment.
Bay of Angels (1963) 
The Umbrellas of Cherbourg (1964)
The Young Girls of Rochefort (1967)
Donkey Skin (1970) 
A Slightly Pregnant Man (1973)
Lady Oscar (1979)
Parking (1985)
Three Seats for the 26th (1988)Ruggero DeodatoClaudio Simonetti
Cut and Run (1985)
Body Count (1986)
Dial: Help (1988)
The Washing Machine (1991)
Ballad in Blood (2016)Jacques DerayMichel Legrand
The Swimming Pool (La Piscine) (1968)
A Few Hours of Sunlight (Un peu de soleil dans l'eau froide) (1971)
The Outside Man (Un homme est mort) (1972)Scott DerricksonChristopher Young
The Exorcism of Emily Rose (2005)
Sinister (2012)
Deliver Us from Evil (2014)Howard DeutchAlan Silvestri
Grumpier Old Men (1995)
The Odd Couple II (1998)
John Debney
The Replacements (2000)
The Whole Ten Yards (2004)
My Best Friend's Girl (2008)Danny DeVitoDavid Newman
Throw Momma from the Train (1987)
The War of the Roses (1989)
Hoffa (1992)
Matilda (1996)
Death to Smoochy (2002)
Duplex (2003)Lukas DhontValentin Hadjadj
L'Infini (2014)
Girl (2018)
Our Nature (2021)
Close (2022)Tom DiCillo   Jim Farmer
Johnny Suede (1991)
Living in Oblivion (1995)
Box of Moonlight (1996)
The Real Blonde (1997)
Double Whammy (2001)William DieterleVictor Young
Love Letters (1945)
The Searching Wind (1946)
The Accused (1949)
Paid in Full (1950)
September Affair (1950)
Omar Khayyam (1957)
Dimitri Tiomkin
Portrait of Jennie (1948)
Peking Express (1951)
Max Steiner
A Dispatch from Reuter's (1940)
Dr. Ehrlich's Magic Bullet (1940)
Bernard Herrmann
The Devil and Daniel Webster (1941)
Portrait of Jennie (1948) - Theme Song Only
Herbert Stothart
Kismet (1931)
Tennessee Johnson (1942)Mark DindalJohn Debney
The Emperor's New Groove (2000)
Chicken Little (2005)Michael DinnerJames Horner
Heaven Help Us (1985)
Off Beat (1986)Edward DmytrykVictor Young
Mystery Sea Raider (1940) - Young is an uncredited composer.
The Left Hand of God (1955)
Bing Presents Oreste (1956) Short
Elmer Bernstein
Walk on the Wild Side (1962)
The Carpetbaggers (1964)
Hugo Friedhofer
Soldier of Fortune (1955)
The Young Lions (1958)
The Blue Angel (1959)
Johnny Green
Raintree County (1957)
Alvarez Kelly (1966)
Leigh Harline
Tender Comrade (1943)
Till the End of Time (1946)
Broken Lance (1954)
Warlock (1959)
Nino Rota
The Hidden Room (1949)
The Reluctant Saint (1962)
Roy Webb
Seven Miles from Alcatraz (1942)
Hitler's Children (1943)
The Falcon Strikes Back (1943)
Behind the Rising Sun (1943)
Murder, My Sweet (1944)
Back to Bataan (1945)
Cornered (1945)
Crossfire (1947)
George Antheil
The Sniper (1952)
The Juggler (1953)
Benjamin Frankel
Give Us This Day (1949)
The End of the Affair (1955)Pete DocterMichael Giacchino
Up (2009)
Inside Out (2015)
Lightyear (2022) - Written byXavier DolanGabriel Yared
Tom at the Farm (2013)
It's Only the End of the World (2016)
The Death and Life of John F. Donovan (2018)Roger DonaldsonJ. Peter Robinson
Cocktail (1988)
Cadillac Man (1990)
The World's Fastest Indian (2005)
The Bank Job (2008)
Seeking Justice (2011)
McLaren (2017)
Maurice Jarre
No Way Out (1987)
Cocktail (1988) Rejected ScoreStanley DonenHenry Mancini
Charade (1963)
Arabesque (1966)
Two for the Road (1967)
Andre Previn
Give a Girl a Break (1953)
It's Always Fair Weather (1955)
Dudley Moore
Bedazzled (1967)
Staircase (1969)
Lennie Hayton
On the Town (1949) - Hayton is credited as musical director.
Love Is Better Than Ever (1952)
Singin' in the Rain (1952) 
Adolph Deutsch
Seven Brides for Seven Brothers (1954) - Deutsch is credited as musical director.
Deep in My Heart (1954)
Funny Face (1957)
Ralph Burns
Lucky Lady (1975)
Movie Movie (1978)Richard DonnerMichael Kamen
Lethal Weapon (1987) with Eric Clapton and David Sanborn.
Lethal Weapon 2 (1989) with Eric Clapton and David Sanborn.
Tales from the Crypt (1989–1996) - They collaborated on some episodes of the series, that Donner produced.
Lethal Weapon 3 (1992) with Eric Clapton and David Sanborn.
Assassins (1995) Rejected Score 
Lethal Weapon 4 (1998) with Eric Clapton and David Sanborn.
X-Men (2000) – Executive Producer
Jerry Goldsmith
The Omen (1976)
The Final Conflict (1981) – Executive Producer
Timeline (2003) Rejected Score
John Williams
Gilligan's Island (1964–1967) - They collaborated on one episode of the series.
Superman (1978)
James Di Pasquale
Sons and Daughters (1974) - They collaborated on three episodes.
Lucas Turner (1974-1975) - They collaborated on a pilot.
Sarah T. - Portrait of a Teenage Alcoholic (1975)Michael DoughertyDouglas Pipes
Trick 'r Treat (2007)
Krampus (2015)Gordon DouglasJerry Goldsmith
Rio Conchos (1964)
Stagecoach (1966)
In Like Flint (1967)
The Detective (1968)
Max Steiner
I Was a Communist for the FBI (1951)
Mara Maru (1952)
The Iron Mistress (1952)
The Charge at Feather River (1953)
So This Is Love (1953)
The McConnell Story (1955)
Fort Dobbs (1958)
The Sins of Rachel Cade (1961)
George Duning
The Doolins of Oklahoma (1949)
Between Midnight and Dawn (1950)Dennis DuganRupert Gregson-Williams
I Now Pronounce You Chuck and Larry (2007)
You Don't Mess with the Zohan (2008)
Grown Ups (2010)
Just Go With It (2011)
Jack and Jill (2011)
Grown Ups 2 (2013)Christian DuguayNormand Corbeil
Screamers (1995)
The Assignment (1997)
The Art of War (2000)
Extreme Ops (2002)
Hitler: The Rise of Evil (2003)
Lies My Mother Told Me (2005)
Human Trafficking (2005–2006)
Boot Camp (2008)Bill DukeMichel Colombier 
Deep Cover (1992)
Deacons for Defense (2003)
Elmer Bernstein
A Rage in Harlem (1991)
The Cemetery Club (1993)
Hoodlum (1997)
Kurt Farquhar
Cover (2007)
Not Easily Broken (2009)
Created Equal (2017)Mark Duplass and Jay Duplass
Michael Andrews
Cyrus (2010)
Jeff, Who Lives at Home (2011)
Togetherness (2015)

 E Clint EastwoodHimself
Bronco Billy (1980) - director, actor, song performer.
Honkytonk Man (1982) - director, producer, actor, song performer.
Heartbreak Ridge (1986) - director, producer, actor, songwriting.
A Perfect World (1993) - director, actor, composer.
The Bridges of Madison County (1995) - director, producer, actor, composer.
Absolute Power (1997) - director, producer, actor, composer.
True Crime (1999) - director, producer, songwriting.
Mystic River (2003) - director, producer, original score.
Million Dollar Baby (2004) - director, producer, actor, original score.
Flags of Our Fathers (2006) - director, producer, original score, songwriting.
Changeling (2008) - director, producer, original score.
Gran Torino (2008) - director, producer, actor, songwriting.
Invictus (2009) - director, producer, songwriting.
Hereafter (2010) - director, producer, music.
J. Edgar (2011) - director, producer, original score.
American Sniper (2014) - director, producer, songwriting.
Sully (2016) - director, producer, songwriting.
Cry Macho (2021) - director, producer, additional music.
Lennie Niehaus
The Outlaw Josey Wales (1976) - Niehaus is an uncredited orchestrator.
The Gauntlet (1977) - Niehaus is an uncredited orchestrator.
Tightrope (1984) - Produced by 
Pale Rider (1985)
Amazing Stories (1985) Episode "Vanessa in the Garden"
Heartbreak Ridge (1986)
Bird (1988)
White Hunter, Black Heart (1990)
The Rookie (1990)
Unforgiven (1992)
A Perfect World (1993)
The Bridges of Madison County (1995)
Absolute Power (1997)
Midnight in the Garden of Good and Evil (1997)
True Crime (1999)
Space Cowboys (2000)
Blood Work (2002)
Mystic River (2003)
Million Dollar Baby (2004)
Flags of Our Fathers (2006)
Letters from Iwo Jima (2006)
Changeling (2008)
Gran Torino (2008)
J. Edgar (2011) - Niehaus arranged the "stars and stripes forever" cue.
Dee Barton
Play Misty for Me (1971)
High Plains Drifter (1973)
Jerry Fielding
The Outlaw Josey Wales (1976)
The Gauntlet (1977)Blake EdwardsHenry Mancini
Mister Cory (1957)
This Happy Feeling (1958) - Mancini composed additional music for the film.
Peter Gunn (1958–1961)
Mr. Lucky (1959–1960)
Operation Petticoat (1959)
High Time (1960)
Breakfast at Tiffany's (1961) - A collaboration with Johnny Mercer.
Johnny Dollar (1962) - Unsold TV pilot 
Boston Terrier (1962) - Unsold TV pilot
Experiment in Terror (1962)
Days of Wine and Roses (1962) - A collaboration with Johnny Mercer.
Soldier in the Rain (1963) - Produced by
The Pink Panther (1963) - A collaboration with Johnny Mercer.
A Shot in the Dark (1964)
The Great Race (1965) - A collaboration with Johnny Mercer.
What Did You Do in the War, Daddy? (1966)
Gunn (1967)
The Party (1968)
Darling Lili (1970) - A collaboration with Johnny Mercer.
The Return of the Pink Panther (1975)
The Pink Panther Strikes Again (1976)
Revenge of the Pink Panther (1978)
10 (1979)
S.O.B. (1981)
Victor/Victoria (1982) - A collaboration with Leslie Bricusse.
Trail of the Pink Panther (1982)
Curse of the Pink Panther (1983)
The Man Who Loved Women (1983)
The Ferret (1984) - They were both involved in this unsold series.
A Fine Mess (1986)
That's Life! (1986)
Blind Date (1987)
Walt Disney's Wonderful World of Color (1954–1992) - They contributed one episode in the series.
Sunset (1988)
Peter Gunn (1989)
Skin Deep (1989)
Switch (1991)
Julie (1992)
Son of the Pink Panther (1993)
Victor/Victoria (1995) - Completed by Frank Wildhorn.
Frank Skinner
This Happy Feeling (1958)
The Perfect Furlough (1958)Robert EggersMark Korven
The Witch (2015)
The Lighthouse (2019)Atom EgoyanMychael Danna
Family Viewing (1987)
Speaking Parts (1989)
The Adjuster (1991)
Exotica (1994)
The Sweet Hereafter (1997)
Felicia's Journey (1999)
Ararat (2002)
Where the Truth Lies (2005)
Adoration (2008)
Chloe (2009)
Devil's Knot (2013)
The Captive (2014)
Remember (2015)
Guest of Honour (2019)Sergei EisensteinSergei Prokofiev
Alexander Nevsky (1938)
Ivan the Terrible Part I (1944)
Ivan the Terrible Part II (1958)Stephan ElliotGuy Gross
Frauds (1993)
The Adventures of Priscilla, Queen of the Desert (1994)
Welcome to Woop Woop (1997)
A Few Best Men (2011)
Swinging Safari (2017)Roland EmmerichDavid Arnold
Stargate (1994)
Independence Day (1996)
Godzilla (1998)
Harald Kloser
The Thirteenth Floor (1999)
The Day After Tomorrow (2004)
10,000 BC (2008)
2012 (2009)
Anonymous (2011)
White House Down (2013)
Independence Day: Resurgence (2016)
Midway (2019)Robert EnricoMaurice Jarre
 For Those I Loved  (1983)
Au nom de tous les miens (miniseries) (1985)Nora EphronGeorge Fenton
Mixed Nuts (1994)
You've Got Mail (1998)
Lucky Numbers (2000)
Bewitched (2005)John ErmanBilly Goldenberg
Another Women's Child (1983)
The Atlanta Child Murders (1985)
John Morris
Stella (1990)
The Last Best Year (1990)
The Last to Go (1991)
Our Sons (1991)
Carolina Skeletons (1991)
Scarlett (1994)
Ellen Foster (1997)
Only Love (1998)
Marvin Hamlisch
A Streetcar Named Desire (1984)
When the Time Comes (1987)
The Two Mrs. Grenvilles (1987)
David (1988)
Candles on Bay Street (2006)
John Kander
An Early Frost (1985)
Breathing Lessons (1994)
The Boys Next Door (1996)
Fred Karlin
Green Eyes (1977)
Alexander: The Other Side of Dawn (1977)
Just Me and You (1978)Daniel EspinosaJon Ekstrand
The Fighter (2003)
Outside Love (2007)
Snabba Cash (2010)
Child 44 (2015)
Life (2017)
Morbius (2022)Gareth EvansAria Prayogi / Fajar Yuskemal
Merantau (2009)
The Raid: Redemption (2011)
V/H/S/2 (2013) - Segment - Safe Haven
The Raid 2 (2014)Chris EyreB.C. Smith 
Smoke Signals (1998) 
Skins (2002)
Skinwalkers (2002)
A Thief of Time (2003)
Edge of America (2003)

 F Roberto FaenzaEnnio Morricone
Escalation (1968)
Si salvi chi vuole (1980)
Copkiller (1986)
The Bachelor (1990)
Jonah Who Lived in the Whale (1993)
Sostiene Pereira (1995)Rainer Werner FassbinderPeer Raben
Love Is Colder Than Death (1969)
Katzelmacher (1969)
The American Soldier (1970)
Gods of the Plague (1970)
 (1970)
Whity (1971)
Rio das Mortes (1971)
Beware of a Holy Whore (1971)
 (1971)
 (1973)
Fox and His Friends (1974)
 (1975)
Mother Küsters' Trip to Heaven (1975)
Satan's Brew (1976)
I Only Want You To Love Me (1976)
Chinese Roulette (1976)
The Stationmaster's Wife (1977)
The Marriage of Maria Braun (1978)
In a Year of 13 Moons (1978)
Despair (1978)
The Third Generation (1979)
Berlin Alexanderplatz (1980)
Lola (1981)
Lili Marleen (1981)
Veronika Voss (1982)
Querelle (1982)Jon FavreauJohn Debney
Elf (2003)
Zathura: A Space Adventure (2005)
Iron Man 2 (2010)
The Jungle Book (2016)Paul FeigMichael Andrews
Freaks and Geeks (1999-2000)
Unaccompanied Minors (2006)
Bridesmaids (2011)
The Heat (2013)
Theodore Shapiro
Spy (2015)
Ghostbusters (2016)
Snatched (2017)
A Simple Favor (2018)
Last Christmas (2019)Sam FellHarry Gregson-Williams
Flushed Away (2006)
Chicken Run: Dawn of the Nugget (2023)Federico FelliniNino Rota
The White Sheik (1952)
I Vitelloni (1953)
La Strada (1954)
Il Bidone (1955)
Nights of Cabiria (1957)
La Dolce Vita (1960)
Boccaccio '70 (1952) - They contributed a segment to the film.
8½ (1963)
Juliet of the Spirits (1965)
Spirits of the Dead (1968) - They contributed a segment to the film.
Fellini Satyricon (1969)
Fellini: A Director's Notebook (1969)
The Clowns (1970)
Roma (1972)
Amarcord (1973)
Fellini's Casanova (1976)
Federico Fellini's Orchestra Rehearsal (1978)
Nicola Povani
Ginger e Fred (1986)
Intervista (1987)
La voce della luna (1990)Abel FerraraJoe Delia
9 Lives of a Wet Pussy (1976)
The Driller Killer (1979)
Ms. 45 (1981)
China Girl (1987)
King of New York (1990)
Bad Lieutenant (1992)
Body Snatchers (1993)
Dangerous Game (1993)
The Addiction (1995)
The Funeral (1996)
The Blackout (1997)
Alive in France (2017)
Piazza Vittorio (2017)
Tommaso (2019)
Siberia (2020)
Schoolly-D
New Rose Hotel (1998)
'R Xmas (2001)Todd FieldThomas Newman
In the Bedroom (2001)
Little Children (2006)Andy FickmanNathan Wang
Who's Your Daddy? (2004)
Reefer Madness: The Movie Musical (2005)
She's the Man (2006)
The Game Plan (2007)
You Again (2010)
Wright vs. Wrong (2010)
Playing with Fire (2019)
One True Loves Eduardo De FilippoNino Rota
Side Street Story (1950)
Filomena Marturano (1951)
Ragazze da marito (1952)
Marito e moglie (1952)
Fortunella (1958)
Kiss the Other Sheik (1965) - segment L'ora di puntaDavid FincherTrent Reznor and Atticus Ross
The Social Network (2010)
The Girl with the Dragon Tattoo (2011)
Gone Girl (2014)
Mank (2020)
Howard Shore
Seven (1995)
The Game (1997)
Panic Room (2002)Terence FisherJames Bernard
 The Curse of Frankenstein (1957)
 Horror of Dracula (1958)
 The Hound of the Baskervilles (1959)
 The Stranglers of Bombay (1959)
 The Gorgon (1964)
 Dracula: Prince of Darkness (1966)
 Frankenstein Created Woman (1967)
 The Devil Rides Out (1968)
 Frankenstein Must Be Destroyed (1969)
 Frankenstein and the Monster from Hell  (1974)Mike FlanaganThe Newton Brothers
Oculus (2013)
Hush (2016)
Before I Wake (2016)
Ouija: Origin of Evil (2016)
Gerald's Game (2017)
The Haunting of Hill House (2018)
Doctor Sleep (2019)
The Haunting of Bly Manor (2020)
Midnight Mass (2021)Gary FlederMark Isham
Kiss the Girls (1997)
Don't Say a Word (2001)
Impostor (2001)
The Bachelor (2008)
Homefront (2013)Richard FleischerLionel Newman
The Girl in the Red Velvet Swing (1955) - Theme Song Only.
Compulsion (1959)
Doctor Dolittle (1967)
The Boston Strangler (1968)
Jerry Goldsmith
Tora! Tora! Tora! (1970)
The Last Run (1971)
The Don Is Dead (1973)
Hugo Friedhofer
Violent Saturday (1955)
Between Heaven and Hell (1956)
Dimitri Tiomkin
So This Is New York (1948)
The Happy Time (1952)
Elmer Bernstein
See No Evil (1971)
The Incredible Sarah (1976)
Mario Nascimbene
The Vikings (1958)
Barabbas (1961)
Leonard Rosenman
Fantastic Voyage (1966)
The Jazz Singer (1980)
Maurice Jarre
Crack in the Mirror (1960)
The Big Gamble (1961)
Mandingo (1975)
Crossed Swords (1977)
Leigh Harline
The Girl in the Red Velvet Swing (1955)
These Thousand Hills (1959)Ruben FleischerLudwig Göransson
30 Minutes or Less (2011)
Venom (2018)
David Sardy
Zombieland (2009)
Zombieland: Double Tap (2019)Victor FlemingFranz Waxman
Captains Courageous (1937)
Test Pilot (1938)
Dr. Jekyll and Mr. Hyde (1941)
Tortilla Flat (1942)
Herbert Stothart
The White Sister (1933)
Treasure Island (1934)
Reckless (1935) - additional music
The Good Earth (1937)
The Wizard of Oz (1939)
A Guy Named Joe (1943)
Adventure (1945)Anne FletcherChristophe Beck
The Guilt Trip (2012)
Hot Pursuit (2015)Dexter Fletcher 
Matthew Margeson
Eddie the Eagle (2015)
Rocketman (2019)John FlynnRichard Marvin
Absence of the Good (1999)
Protection (2001)
Bill Conti
Lock Up (1989)
Nails (1992)James FoleyCarter Burwell
Two Bits (1995)
Fear (1996)
The Chamber (1996)
The Corruptor (1999)
Danny Elfman
Fifty Shades Darker (2017)
Fifty Shades Freed (2018)
Maurice Jarre
After Dark, My Sweet (1990)
Two Bits (1995) Rejected ScoreBryan ForbesJohn Barry
The L-Shaped Room (1962)
Seance on a Wet Afternoon (1964)
King Rat (1965)
The Wrong Box (1966)
The Whisperers (1967)
Deadfall (1968)Maya ForbesTheodore Shapiro	
Infinitely Polar Bear (2014)
The Polka King (2017)Tom FordAbel Korzeniowski
A Single Man (2009)
Nocturnal Animals (2016)John FordVictor Young
Rio Grande (1950)
This is Korea (1951)
The Quiet Man (1952)
The Sun Shines Bright (1953)
Alfred Newman
Arrowsmith (1931)
Flesh (1932)
Wee Willie Winkie (1937)
The Hurricane (1937)
Young Mr. Lincoln (1939)
Drums Along the Mohawk (1939)
The Grapes of Wrath (1940)
Tobacco Road (1941) - additional music
How Green Was My Valley (1941)
The Battle of Midway (1942) Short
December 7th (1943)
At the Front in North Africa with the U.S. Army (1943) Short
When Willie Comes Marching Home (1950)
What Price Glory (1952)
How the West Was Won (1962) Segment "The Civil War"
Max Steiner
The Lost Patrol (1934)
The Informer (1935)
The Searchers (1956)
Cyril J. Mockridge
The World Moves On (1934)
Judge Priest (1934)
At the Front in North Africa with the U.S. Army (1943) Short - Mockridge is an uncredited composer.
My Darling Clementine (1946)
The Man Who Shot Liberty Valance (1962)
Donovan's Reef (1963)
George Duning
The Long Gray Line (1955)
Two Rode Together (1961)
David Buttolph
Tobacco Road (1941)
The Horse Soldiers (1959)
Richard Hageman
Stagecoach (1939)
The Long Voyage Home (1940)
The Fugitive (1947)
Fort Apache (1948)
3 Godfathers (1948)
She Wore a Yellow Ribbon (1949)
Wagon Master (1950)Bill ForsythMichael Gibbs
Housekeeping (1987)
Breaking In (1980)
Being Human (1994)
Gregory's Two Girls (1999)
Mark Knopfler
Local Hero (1983)
Comfort and Joy (1984)
Collin Tully
That Sinking Feeling (1979)
Gregory's Girl (1980)Bob FosseRalph Burns
Sweet Charity (1969) - Orchestration.
Cabaret (1972)
Liza with a Z (1972) - Burns was credited as musical arranger.
Lenny (1974)
All That Jazz (1979)
Star 80 (1983)Georges FranjuMaurice Jarre
Hôtel des Invalides (1951) short
Le Théâtre national populaire (1956) short
La Tête contre les murs (1958)
Les Yeux sans visage (1960)
Pleins feux sur l'assassin (1961)
Thérèse Desqueyroux
Judex (1963)Scott FrankCarlos Rafael Rivera
A Walk Among the Tombstones (2014)
Godless (2017)
The Queen's Gambit (2020)David FrankelTheodore Shapiro
The Devil Wears Prada (2006)
Marley & Me (2008)
The Big Year (2011)
Hope Springs (2012)
One Chance (2013)
Collateral Beauty (2016)John FrankenheimerGary Chang
52 Pick-Up (1986)
Dead Bang (1989)
Against the Wall (1994)
The Burning Season (1994)
Andersonville (1996)
The Island of Dr. Moreau (1996)
George Wallace (1997)
Path to War (2002)
Elmer Bernstein
Birdman of Alcatraz (1962)
The Gypsy Moths (1969)
Jerry Goldsmith
Playhouse 90 (1956-1960) - They collaborated on two episodes in the series.
Seven Days in May (1964)
Seconds (1966)
The Challenge (1982)
Bill Conti
The Fourth War (1990)
Year of the Gun (1991)
Tales from the Crypt (1992) Episode "Maniac at Large"
Maurice Jarre
The Train (1964)
Grand Prix (1966)
The Fixer (1968)
The Extraordinary Seaman (1969)
Leonard Rosenman
The Young Stranger (1957)
Prophecy (1979)
David Amram
Startime (1959-1961) - They collaborated on one episode.
NBC Sunday Showcase (1959-1961) - They collaborated on one episode.
The Young Savages (1961)
The Manchurian Candidate (1962)
Seven Days in May (1964) Rejected ScoreRichard FranklinBrian May
The True Story of Eskimo Nell (1975)
Patrick (1978)
Roadgames (1981)
Cloak & Dagger (1984)
Jerry Goldsmith
Psycho II (1983)
Link (1986)James FrawleyArthur B. Rubinstein
Gridlock (1980)
Bulba (1981)
Scarecrow and Mrs. King (1983-1987) - They contributed few episodes of the series.Stephen FrearsAlexandre Desplat
The Queen (2006)
Chéri (2009)
Tamara Drewe (2010)
Philomena (2013)
Florence Foster Jenkins (2016)
The Lost King (2022)
George Fenton
Me! I'm Afraid of Virginia Woolf (1978)
Doris and Doreen (1978)
Afternoon Off (1979)
One Fine Day (1979)
Bloody Kids (1980)
BBC2 Playhouse (1981)
Walter (1982)
Walter & June (1983)
Saigon -Year of the Cat (1983)
Dangerous Liaisons (1988)
Hero (1992)
Mary Reilly (1996)
Mrs. Henderson Presents (2005)William FriedkinEnnio Morricone
C.A.T. Squad (1986)
Rampage (1987)
C.A.T. Squad: Python Wolf (1988)
Jack Nitzsche
The Exorcist (1973) - additional music
Cruising (1980)
Brian Tyler
The Hunted (2003)
Bug (2006)Lucio FulciFabio Frizzi
Four of the Apocalypse (1975) with Vince Tempera & Franco Bixio
Dracula in the Provinces (1975) with Vince Tempera & Franco Bixio
Sette note in nero (1977) with Vince Tempera & Franco Bixio
Silver Saddle (1978) with Vince Tempera & Franco Bixio
Zombi 2 (1979)
Contraband (1980)
City of the Living Dead (1980)
The Beyond (1981)
Manhattan Baby (1982)
A Cat in the Brain (1990)Samuel FullerPaul Dunlap
The Baron of Arizona (1950)
The Steel Helmet (1951)
Shock Corridor (1963)
The Naked Kiss (1964)
Leigh Harline
Pickup on South Street (1953)
House of Bamboo (1955)
Harry Sukman
Forty Guns (1957)
Verboten! (1959)
The Crimson Kimono (1959) 
Dog Face (1959)
Underworld U.S.A. (1961)
Merrill's Marauders (1962)Brad FurmanChris Hajian
The Take (2007)
The Lincoln Lawyer (2011)
The Infiltrator (2016)
City of Lies (2018)Antoine FuquaHarry Gregson-Williams
The Replacement Killers (1998)
The Equalizer (2014)
The Equalizer 2 (2018)
Infinite (2021)
James Horner
Southpaw (2015)
The Magnificent Seven (2016)
Mark Mancina
Bait (2000)
Training Day (2001)
Shooter (2007)
Hans Zimmer
Tears of the Sun (2003)
King Arthur (2004)Sidney J. FuriePaul Zaza
Iron Eagle on the Attack (1995)
The Rage (1997)
Married to a Stranger (1997)
Michel Legrand
Lady Sings the Blues (1972)
Sheila Levine Is Dead and Living in New York (1975)
Gable and Lombard (1976)
Varouje
American Soldiers (2005)
The Four Horsemen (2008)
Robert Carli
My 5 Wives (2000)
Road Rage (2000)
Cord (2000)

 G Rodrigo GarciaEdward Shearmur
Things You Can Tell Just by Looking at Her (2000)
Nine Lives (2005)
Passengers (2008)  
Mother and Child (2009)
Four Good Days (2020)Alex GarlandGeoff Barrow & Ben Salisbury
Ex Machina (2014)
Annihilation (2018)
Devs (2020)Philippe GarrelJohn Cale
La Naissance de l'amour (1993)
Le Vent de la nuit (1999)
A Burning Hot Summer (2011)Mick GarrisNicholas Pike
Critters 2: The Main Course (1988)
Sleepwalkers (1992)
Tales From the Crypt (1994) - They collaborated on an episode. 
The Shining (1997)
Host (1998)
The Judge (2001)
Riding the Bullet (2004)
Masters of Horror (2005) - Episode Chocolate 
Desperation (2006)
Bag of Bones (2011)Alejandro González IñárrituGustavo Santaolalla

Amores Perros (2000)
11'09"01 September 11 (2002) - They contributed a segment.
21 Grams (2003)
Babel (2006)
Biutiful (2010)
Bryce Dessner
The Revenant (2015)
Bardo (2022)Mel GibsonJohn Debney
The Passion of the Christ (2004)
Hacksaw Ridge (2016) Rejected Score
James Horner
The Man Without a Face (1993)
Braveheart (1995)
Apocalypto (2006)Lewis GilbertMalcolm Arnold
Albert R.N. (1953)
The Sea Shall Not Have Them (1954)
John Barry
You Only Live Twice (1967)
Moonraker (1979)
Wilfred Burns
There Is Another Sun (1951)
Emergency Call (1952)
Marvin Hamlisch
The Spy Who Loved Me (1977)
Shirley Valentine (1989) Hamlisch wrote the theme song.
David Hentschel
Operation Daybreak (1975)
Seven Nights in Japan (1976)
Educating Rita (1983)
Anthony Hopkins
Time Gentlemen, Please! (1952)
Johnny on the Run (1953)
Cast a Dark Shadow (1955)
Clifton Parker
Sink the Bismarck (1960)
H.M.S. Defiant (1962)
Debbie Wiseman
Haunted (1995)
Before You Go (2002)Stuart GillardChristopher Brady
Full-Court Miracle (2003)
Going to the Mat (2004)
Robert Duncan
The Cutting Edge: Chasing the Dream (2008)
Avalon High (2010)
Girl vs. Monster (2012)
John Van Tongeren
Twitches (2005)
The Initiation of Sarah (2006)
Twitches Too (2007)
WarGames: The Dead Code (2008)Terry GilliamMychael Danna & Jeff Danna
Tideland (2005)
The Imaginarium of Doctor Parnassus (2009)
George Fenton
The Fisher King (1991)
The Zero Theorem (2013)
Michael Kamen
Brazil (1985)
The Adventures of Baron Munchausen (1988)
Fear & Loathing in Las Vegas (1998)Dan GilroyJames Newton Howard
Nightcrawler (2014)
Roman J. Israel, Esq. (2017)Tony GilroyJames Newton Howard
Michael Clayton (2007)
Duplicity (2009)
The Bourne Legacy (2012)
Nightcrawler (2014) – Produced byWilliam GirdlerRobert O. Ragland
Abby (1974)
Project Kill (1976)
Grizzly (1976)
Lalo Schifrin
Day of the Animals (1977)
The Manitou (1978)John GlenJohn Barry
Octopussy (1983)
A View to a Kill (1985)
The Living Daylights (1987)Bert I. GordonAlbert Glasser
Beginning of the End (1957)
The Cyclops (1957)
The Amazing Colossal Man (1957)
Attack of the Puppet People (1958)
War of the Colossal Beast (1958)
Earth vs. The Spider (1958)
The Boy and the Pirates (1960)
Tormented (1960)Will GluckDominic Lewis
Peter Rabbit (2018)
Peter Rabbit 2: The Runaway (2021)Jean-Luc GodardMichel Legrand
A Woman Is a Woman (1961)
My Life to Live (1962)
Band of Outsiders (1964)
La Chinoise (1967)James GoldstoneBilly Goldenberg
A Clear and Present Danger (1970)
Red Sky at Morning (1971)
Dr. Max (1974) 
Sentimental Journey (1984)
The Sun Also Rises (1984)
Dave Grusin
A Man Called Gannon (1968)
Winning (1969)
The Gang That Couldn't Shoot Straight (1971)
Eric (1975)
The Sad and Lonely Sundays (1976)
Lalo Schifrin
Blue Light (1966)
Rollercoaster (1977)
When Time Ran Out... (1980)
Rita Hayworth: The Love Goddess (1983)
Earth Star Voyager (1988)
Quincy Jones
Ironside (1967)
Jigsaw (1968)
Brother John (1971)
John Addison
Swashbuckler (1976)
Charles & Diana: A Royal Love Story (1982)Michael GordonFrank De Vol
Pillow Talk (1959)
Boys' Night Out (1962)
For Love or Money (1963)
Texas Across the River (1966)Seth GordonChristopher Lennertz
Four Christmases (2008)
Horrible Bosses (2011)
Identity Thief (2013)
Baywatch (2017)Stuart GordonRichard Band
Re-Animator (1985)
From Beyond (1986)
The Pit and the Pendulum (1991)
Castle Freak (1995)
Masters of Horror (2005)- H. P. Lovecraft's Dreams in the Witch-House
Bobby Johnston
King of the Ants (2003)
Edmond (2005)
Stuck (2007)
Fear Itself (2008) - They collaborated on an episode. 
Colin Towns
Daughter of Darkness (1990)
Space Truckers (1996)Raja GosnellHeitor Pereira
Beverly Hills Chihuahua (2008)
The Smurfs (2011)
The Smurfs 2 (2013)
Show Dogs (2018)
David Newman
Never Been Kissed (1999)
Scooby-Doo (2002)
Scooby-Doo 2: Monsters Unleashed (2004)David S. GoyerRamin Djawadi
Blade: Trinity (2004)
Blade: The Series (2006)
The Unborn (2009)
FlashForward (2009–2010)William GrahamLaurence Rosenthal
21 Hours at Munich (1976)
The Amazing Howard Hughes (1977)
And I Alone Survived (1979)
Orphan Train (1979)
Rage! (1980)
Mussolini: The Untold Story (1985)
Proud Men (1987)
Street of Dreams (1988)
Billy The Kid (1989)
The Man Who Captured Eichmann (1996)
Jerry Goldsmith
Police Story (1973-1978) - They collaborated on the pilot episode.
Contract on Cherry Street (1977)
Lalo Schifrin
Blue Light (1966) - They collaborated on one of the episodes of the series.
The Doomsday Flight (1966)
Three for Danger (1967)
Basil Poledouris
Congratulations, It's a Boy! (1971)
Return to the Blue Lagoon (1991)
Dave Grusin
Waterhole No. 3 (1967)
The Intruder (1970)
Bruce Broughton
M.A.D.D.: Mothers Against Drunk Drivers (1983)
George Washington II: The Forging of a Nation (1986)
 Chris Boardman
Elvis and the Colonels: The Untold Story (1993)
Beyond Suspicion (1993)
A Friend to Die For (1994)
Terror in the Shadows (1995)
Beauty's Revenge (1995)
Sleeping with the Devil (1997)
The Hunt for the Unicorn Killer (1999)
Acceptable Risk (2001)
Blood Crime (2002)
Fred Karlin
Minstrel Man (1977)
Transplant (1979)
Deadly Encounter (1982)
Quincy Jones
Ironside (1967-1975) - They collaborated on one episode.
Honky (1971)
David Shire
CBS Playhouse (1967-1970) - They collaborated on two episodes.
Marriage: Year One (1971)
Bed of Lies (1992)
Jack Elliott
Birds of Prey (1973)
Get Christie Love (1974-1975) Episode "Pilot" with Allyn Ferguson.
Mark Snow
Secrets of a Married Man (1984)
The X-Files (1993-2018) - They contributed on three episodes in the original series.
Allyn Ferguson
Birds of Prey (1973)
Get Christie Love (1974-1975) Episode "Pilot" with Jack Elliott.
Peter Matz
Larry (1974)
One in a Million: The Ron LeFlore Story (1978)Walter GraumanLalo Schifrin
I Deal in Danger (1966)
Blue Light (1966) – They contributed two episodes in the series.
Shakedown on Sunset Strip (1988)
Dave Grusin
Blue Light (1966) – They collaborated one episode in the series.
The Forgotten Man (1971)James GrayChristopher Spelman
Two Lovers (2008) - Music adaptor 
The Immigrant (2013)
The Lost City of Z (2016)
Armageddon Time (2022)David Gordon GreenDavid Wingo
George Washington (2000)
All the Real Girls (2003)
Snow Angels (2007)
The Sitter (2011)
Prince Avalanche (2013)
Joe (2013)
Manglehorn (2014)
Our Brand Is Crisis (2015)Reinaldo Marcus GreenKris Bowers
Monsters and Men (2018)
King Richard (2021)Peter GreenawayMichael Nyman
Vertical Features Remake (1978)
The Falls (1980)
The Draughtsman's Contract (1982)
Four American Composers (1983) - Nyman was credited as musical advisor.
A Zed and Two Noughts (1985)
Drowning by Numbers (1988)
The Cook, the Thief, His Wife & Her Lover (1989)
Prospero's Books (1990)Paul GreengrassJohn Powell
The Bourne Supremacy (2004)
United 93 (2006)
The Bourne Ultimatum (2007)
Green Zone (2010)
Jason Bourne (2016) David GreeneArthur B. Rubinstein
Murder Among Friends (1985)
The Betty Ford Story (1986)
Inherit the Wind (1988)
Jerry Goldsmith
General Electric Theater (1953–1962) – They collaborated on one of the episodes.
CBS Playhouse (1967–1970) – They collaborated on one of the episodes.
Sebastian (1968)
Basil Kirchin
The Shuttered Room (1967)
The Strange Affair (1968)
Gil Melle
World War III (1982)
Fatal Vision (1984)
Sweet Revenge (1984)
Circle of Violence: A Family Drama (1986)Maggie GreenwaldDavid Mansfield
The Ballad of Little Jo (1993)
Songcatcher (2000)
What Makes a Family (2001) 
Get A Clue (2002)
Tempted (2003)
Comfort and Joy (2003)
Good Morning, Killer (2011)
The Last Keepers (2013) 
Sophie and the Rising Sun (2016)Tom GriesBilly Goldenberg
The Glass House (1972)
The Migrants (1974)
Helter Skelter (1976)
Jerry Goldsmith
Cain's Hundred (1961-1962) - They collaborated on one episode of the series.
100 Rifles (1969)
QB VII (1974) 
Breakout (1975)
Breakheart Pass (1975)Christopher GuestC.J. Vanston
Waiting for Guffman (1996) - Music Producer
Almost Heroes (1998)
Best in Show (2000)
A Mighty Wind (2003) - Music Producer
For Your Consideration (2006)
Mascots (2016)Davis GuggenheimChristophe Beck
Waiting for Superman (2010)
The Road We've Traveled (2012) ShortJames GunnTyler Bates 
Slither (2006)
Super (2010)
Movie 43 (2013)
Guardians of the Galaxy (2014)
The Belko Experiment (2016)
Guardians of the Galaxy Vol. 2 (2017)
John Murphy
The Suicide Squad (2021)
Guardians of the Galaxy Vol. 3 (2023)John GuillerminJohn Barry
Never Let Go (1960)
King Kong (1976)
John Addison
Hell, Heaven or Hoboken (1958)
Guns at Batasi (1964)

 H Taylor HackfordMichel Colombier
Against All Odds (1984)
White Nights (1985)
Danny Elfman
Dolores Claiborne (1995)
Proof of Life (2000)
James Newton Howard
Everybody's All-American (1988)
The Devil's Advocate (1997)Randa HainesMichael Convertino
Children of a Lesser God (1986)
Tales from the Crypt (1989–1996) (Episode: "Judy, You're Not Yourself Today")
The Doctor (1991)
Wrestling Ernest Hemingway (1993)
Dance with Me (1998)Jack Haley Jr.Fred Karlin
Life Goes to War: Hollywood and the Home Front (1977)
Hollywood: The Gift of Laughter (1982)
Henry Mancini
That's Entertainment! (1974)
Better Late Than Never (1983) – Produced by
That's Dancing (1985)Don HallHenry Jackman
Winnie the Pooh (2011)
Big Hero 6 (2014)
Strange World (2022)Lasse HallstromRachel Portman
The Cider House Rules (1999)
Chocolat (2000)
Christopher Young
The Shipping News (2001)
An Unfinished Life (2005) Additional Music/Rejected Score
Bjorn Isfalt
My Life as a Dog (1985)
What's Eating Gilbert Grape (1993) with Alan Parker.
Deborah Lurie
An Unfinished Life (2005)
Dear John (2010)
Save Haven (2013)
Georg Riedel
The Children of Noisy Village (1986)
More About the Children of Noisy Village (1987)John HamburgTheodore Shapiro
Safe Men (1998)
Along Came Polly (2004)
I Love You, Man (2009)
Why Him? (2016)Guy HamiltonRon Goodwin
Battle of Britain (1969)
Force 10 from Navarone (1978)
John Barry
Man in the Middle (1964)
Goldfinger (1964)
The Party's Over (1965)
Diamonds Are Forever (1971)
The Man with the Golden Gun (1974)John Lee HancockCarter Burwell
The Rookie (2002)
The Alamo (2004)
The Blind Side (2009)
The Founder (2016)
Thomas Newman
Saving Mr. Banks (2013)
The Highwaymen (2019)
The Little Things (2021)Curtis HansonJerry Goldsmith
The River Wild (1994)
L.A. Confidential (1997)
Christopher Young
Wonder Boys (2000)
Lucky You (2007)
Charles Bernstein
Sweet Kill (1972)
Evil Town (1987)Keiichi HaraHarumi Fuuki
Miss Hokusai (2015)
Birthday Wonderland (2019)
Lonely Castle in the Mirror (2022)Catherine HardwickeAlex Heffes
Red Riding Hood (2011) with Brian Reitzell.
Miss Bala (2019)
Mark Mothersbaugh
Thirteen (2003)
Lords of Dogtown (2005)Joseph HardyArthur B. Rubinstein
Addie and the King of Heart (1976)
Return Engagement (1978)
Maurice Jarre
Great Expectations (1974)
The Silence (1975)
The Users (1978)Renny HarlinTuomas Kantelinen
Mindhunters (2004)
The Legend of Hercules (2014)
Trevor Rabin
Deep Blue Sea (1999)
Exorcist: The Beginning (2004)
12 Rounds (2009)
5 Days of War (2011)Hal HartleyHimself
Surviving Desire (1991)
Ambition (1991)
Theory of Achievement (1991)
Simple Men (1992)
Opera No. 1 (1994)
Amateur (1994)
Flirt (1995)
Henry Fool (1997)
Kimono (2000)
No Such Thing (2001)
The Girl from Monday (2005)
Fay Grim (2006)
The Apologies (2010)
Meanwhile (2011)
Ned Rifle (2014)
My America (2014)Anthony HarveyJohn Barry
Dutchman (1966)
The Lion in Winter (1968)
They Might Be Giants (1971)
The Glass Menagerie (1973)
Svengali (1983)Henry HathawayElmer Bernstein
The Sons of Katie Elder (1965)
True Grit (1969)
Alfred Newman
The Real Glory (1939)
Brigham Young (1940)
Ten Gentlemen from West Point (1942)
The House on 92nd Street (1945) - additional music
Call Northside 777 (1948)
Down to the Sea in Ships (1949)
Fourteen Hours (1951)
O. Henry's Full House (1952) Segment "The Clarion Call"
Woman Obsessed (1959) - additional music
How the West Was Won (1962) - They contributed on three segments Hathaway directed.
Nevada Smith (1966)
Bernard Herrmann
White Witch Doctor (1953)
Garden of Evil (1954)
Dimitri Tiomkin
Spawn of the North (1938)
Circus World (1964)
Hugo Friedhofer
China Girl (1942)
Home in Indiana (1944)
Wing and a Prayer (1944)
Woman Obsessed (1959)
Sol Kaplan
Rawhide (1951)
Diplomatic Courier (1952)
Niagara (1953)
Cyril J. Mockridge
Johnny Apollo (1940)
Brigham Young (1940) - Mockridge is an uncredited composer.
Ten Gentlemen from West Point (1942) - Mockridge is an uncredited composer.
The Dark Corner (1946)
Milan Roder
The Lives of a Bengal Lancer (1935) - Roder is an uncredited composer.
Souls at Sea (1937)
Daniele Amfitheatrof
The Desert Fox: The Story of Rommel (1951)
From Hell to Texas (1958)
David Buttolph
Brigham Young (1940) - Buttolph is an uncredited composer.
Ten Gentlemen from West Point (1942) - Buttolph is an uncredited composer.
The House on 92nd Street (1945)
Kiss of Death (1947)
13 Rue Madeleine (1947)
Dominic Frontiere
Niagara (1953) - Frontiere is an uncredited musician.
Seven Thieves (1960)
Lionel Newman
Kiss of Death (1947) - Conductor
Rawhide (1951) - Musical Director
Diplomatic Courier (1952) - Musical Director
Niagara (1953) - Musical Director
The Racers (1955) - Conductor
The Bottom of the Bottle (1956) - Conductor
23 Paces to Baker Street (1956) - Conductor
Woman Obsessed (1959) - Conductor
North to Alaska (1960)Howard HawksDimitri Tiomkin
Only Angels Have Wings (1938)
Red River (1948)
The Big Sky (1952)
Land of the Pharaohs (1955)
Rio Bravo (1959)
Alfred Newman
Barbary Coast (1935)
Come and Get It (1936) – William Wyler co-directed this film.
Ball of Fire (1941)
O. Henry's Full House (1952) Segment "The Ransom of Red Chief"
Henry Mancini
Hatari! (1962)
Man's Favorite Sport?(1964)
Franz Waxman
Air Force (1943)
To Have and Have Not (1944)Todd HaynesCarter Burwell
Velvet Goldmine (1998)
Mildred Pierce (2011)
Carol (2015)
Wonderstruck (2017)Michel HazanaviciusLudovic Bource
Mes amis (1999)
OSS 117: Cairo, Nest of Spies (2006)
OSS 117: Lost in Rio (2009)
The Artist (2011)
Alexandre Desplat
Final Cut (2022)
The Most Precious of Cargoes (2024)Amy HeckerlingDavid Kitay
Look Who's Talking (1989)
Look Who's Talking Too (1990)
Clueless (1995)
Clueless (1996)
Loser (2000)
Vamps (2012)Rob HeddenFred Mollin
Friday the 13th: The Series (1987-1990) - They contributed some episodes to the series.
Friday the 13th Part VIII: Jason Takes Manhattan (1989)Richard T. HeffronPete Carpenter & Mike Post
The Morning After (1974)
The Rockford Files (1974—1980) — They contributed a pilot episode.
Bill Conti
I, the Jury (1982)
North and South (1985)
Napoleon and Josephine: A Love Story (1987) — Theme Music Only.
Charles Bernstein
Trackdown (1976)
Outlaw Blues (1977)
Foolin' Around (1980)
Gerald Fried
I Will Fight No More Forever (1975)
A Killer in the Family (1983)
The Mystic Warrior (1984)
Napoleon and Josephine: A Love Story (1987)
Pete Rugolo
Do You Take This Stranger? (1971)
The Bold Ones: The Lawyers (1969—1972) — They contributed three episodes.
Toma (1973—1974) — They contributed a pilot episode.
Robert Prince
Banacek (1972—1974) — They collaborated on one episode.
Newman's Law (1974)Stuart HeislerEmil Newman
Journey into Light (1951)
Beachhead (1954)Marielle HellerNate Heller
The Diary of a Teenage Girl (2015)
Can You Ever Forgive Me? (2018)
A Beautiful Day in the Neighborhood (2019)Jim HensonTrevor Jones
The Dark Crystal (1982) Frank Oz co-directed this film.
Labyrinth (1986)Stephen HerekMichael Kamen
The Three Musketeers (1993)
Mr. Holland's Opus (1995)
101 Dalmatians (1996)
David Newman
Critters (1986)
Bill & Ted's Excellent Adventure (1989)
Don't Tell Mom the Babysitter's Dead (1991)
The Mighty Ducks (1992)
Life or Something Like It (2002)
Man of the House (2005)Michael O'HerlihyMorton Stevens
Hawaii Five-O (1968 to 1980)
Deadly Harvest (1972)
Peter Lundy and the Medicine Hat Stallion (1977)
Backstairs at the White House (1979)
The Flame is Love (1979)
Detour to Terror (1980)
The Million Dollar Face (1981)
I Married Wyatt Earp (1983)
Matlock (1987)Mark HermanJohn Altman
Little Voice (1998)
Hope Springs (2003)
Trevor Jones
Blame it on the Bellboy (1992)
Brassed Off (1996)Rowdy HerringtonBrad Fiedel
Gladiator (1992)
Striking Distance (1993)John HerzfeldAnthony Marinelli
2 Days in the Valley (1996)
Don King: Only in America (1997)
15 Minutes (2001)Werner HerzogKlaus Badelt
Invincible (2001) (with Hans Zimmer)
Rescue Dawn (2006)
Happy People: A Year in the Taiga (2010)
Queen of the Desert (2015)
Mark Degli Antoni
Into the Abyss (2011)
On Death Row (2012-2013)
Lo and Behold, Reveries of the Connected World (2016)
Popol Vuh
Aguirre, Wrath of God (1972)
The Great Ecstasy of Woodcarver Steiner (1974)
Heart of Glass (1976)
Nosferatu: Phantom der Nacht (1979)
Fitzcarraldo (1982)
Gasherbrum - Der leuchtende Berg (1984)
Cobra Verde (1987)
My Best Fiend (1999)
Ernst Reijseger
The White Diamond (2004)
The Wild Blue Yonder (2005)
My Son, My Son, What Have Ye Done? (2009)
Cave of Forgotten Dreams (2010)
Salt and Fire (2016)
Nomad: In the Footsteps of Bruce Chatwin (2019)
Family Romance, LLC (2019)Peter HewittChristophe Beck
Garfield: The Movie (2004)
Zoom (2006)
Harry Gregson-Williams
The Borrowers (1997)
Whatever Happened to Harold Smith? (1999)
Rupert Gregson-Williams
Thunderpants (2002)
The Maiden Heist (2009)Colin HigginsCharles Fox
Foul Play (1978)
9 to 5 (1980)George Roy HillElmer Bernstein
The World of Henry Orient (1964)
Hawaii (1966)
Thoroughly Modern Millie (1967)
Slap Shot (1977) - additional music
Funny Farm (1988)Tim HillChristopher Lennertz
Alvin and the Chipmunks (2007)
Hop (2011)Walter HillRy Cooder 
The Long Riders (1980)
Southern Comfort (1981)
Streets of Fire (1984)
Brewster's Millions (1985)
Blue City (1986) - Produced By
Crossroads (1986)
Extreme Prejudice (1987) - Source music / rejected score
Johnny Handsome (1989)
Tales from the Crypt (1989–1996) - They contributed on the first episode of the series.
Trespass (1992)
Geronimo: An American Legend (1993)
Last Man Standing (1996)
James Horner
48 Hrs. (1982)
Streets of Fire (1984) Rejected Score
Aliens (1986) – Executive Producer
Red Heat (1988)
Tales from the Crypt (1989–1996) - They contributed on one of the episodes of the series. 
Another 48 Hrs. (1990)
Jerry Goldsmith
Alien (1979) – Produced by
Extreme Prejudice (1987)
Barry De Vorzon
Hard Times (1975)
The Warriors (1979)Stephen HillenburgGregor Narholz
SpongeBob SquarePants (1999–present)
The SpongeBob SquarePants Movie (2004)Arthur HillerStewart Copeland
See No Evil, Hear No Evil (1989)
Taking Care of Business (1990)
National Lampoon's Pucked (2006)
Henry Mancini
W.C. Fields and Me (1976)
Silver Streak (1976)
Nightwing (1979)
Married to It (1991)
Jerry Goldsmith
Gunsmoke (1955-1975) - They collaborated on one of the episodes of the series.
The Lonely Guy (1984)Alfred HitchcockBernard Herrmann
The Trouble with Harry (1955)
The Wrong Man (1956)
The Man Who Knew Too Much (1956)
Vertigo (1958)
North by Northwest (1959)
Psycho (1960)
The Birds (1963) - Herrmann was credited as sound consultant.
The Alfred Hitchcock Hour (1962–1965)
Marnie (1965)
Torn Curtain (1966) Rejected Score
Hugo Friedhofer
Rebecca (1940) - Friedhofer is an uncredited orchestrator.
Lifeboat (1944)
Dimitri Tiomkin
Shadow of a Doubt (1943)
Strangers on a Train (1951)
I Confess (1953)
Dial M for Murder (1954)
Franz Waxman
Rebecca (1940)
Suspicion (1941)
The Paradine Case (1947)
Rear Window (1954)Bong Joon HoJaeil Jung
Okja (2017)
Parasite (2019)Michael HoffmanJames Newton Howard
Promised Land (1987)
Some Girls (1988)
Restoration (1995)
One Fine Day (1996)
The Emperor's Club (2002)P.J. HoganJames Newton Howard
My Best Friend's Wedding (1997)
Unconditional Love (2002)
Peter Pan (2003)
Confessions of a Shopaholic (2009)Todd HollandBruce Broughton
Amazing Stories (1985-1987) - They collaborated on two episodes of the series.
Krippendorf's Tribe (1998)Rod HolcombArthur B. Rubinstein
Scarecrow and Mrs. King (1983-1987) - They collaborated on three episodes of the series.
The Carter Affair (1984)Agnieszka HollandJan A.P. Kaczmarek
Total Eclipse (1995)
Washington Square (1997)
The Third Miracle (1999)
Shot in the Heart (2001)
A Girl Like Me: The Gwen Araujo Story (2006)Savage Steve HollandGuy Moon
Big Time Rush (2009-2013)
A Fairly Odd Movie: Grow Up, Timmy Turner! (2011)
Big Time Movie (2012)
A Fairly Odd Christmas (2012)
A Fairly Odd Summer (2014)
100 Things to Do Before High School (2015-2016)
Zack Ryan
Santa Hunters (2014)
Rufus (2016)
Rufus 2 (2017)
Malibu Rescue (2019–present)
Joseph Vitarelli
How I Got into College (1989)
Safety Patrol (1998)Ishirō HondaAkira Ifukube
Godzilla (1954)
Rodan (1956)
Godzilla, King of the Monsters! (1956)
The Mysterians (1957)
Varan the Unbelievable (1958)
Battle in Outer Space (1959)
King Kong vs. Godzilla (1962)
Atragon (1963)
Mothra vs. Godzilla (1964)
Dogora (1964)
Ghidrah, the Three-Headed Monster (1964)
Invasion of Astro-Monster (1965)
Frankenstein Conquers the World (1965)
The War of the Gargantuas (1966)
King Kong Escapes (1967)
Destroy All Monsters (1968)
Latitude Zero (1969)
Space Amoeba (1970)
Terror of Mechagodzilla (1975)Gavin HoodPaul Hepker & Mark Kilian
Tsotsi (2005)
Rendition (2007)
Eye in the Sky (2015)
Official Secrets (2019)Kevin HooksBruce Broughton
Glory & Honor (1998)
The Orville (2017–present) - They contributed an episode of the series.Stephen HopkinsAlan Silvestri
Tales from the Crypt (1989-1996) - They collaborated on two episodes Stephen directed.
Predator 2 (1990)
Judgment Night (1993)
Blown Away (1994)Tom HooperAlexandre Desplat
The King's Speech (2010)
The Danish Girl (2015)
Robert Lane
Red Dust (2004)
The Damned United (2009)Mamoru HosodaMasakatsu Takagi
Wolf Children (2012)
The Boy and the Beast (2015)
Mirai of the Future (2018)Ron HowardJames Horner
Cocoon (1985)
Willow (1988)
Vibes (1988) — Executive Producer
Apollo 13 (1995)
Ransom (1996)
How the Grinch Stole Christmas (2000)
A Beautiful Mind (2001)
The Missing (2003)
Randy Newman
Parenthood (1989)
The Paper (1994)
Thomas Newman
Gung Ho (1986)
Cinderella Man (2005)
Joe Renzetti
Cotton Candy (1978)
The Time Crystal (1981)
Lorne Balfe
Frost/Nixon (2008) - additional music/orchestrator.
Angels & Demons (2009) - additional music.
Rush (2013) - additional music.
Genius (2017–Present) - They contributed on one episode in the series premiere.
Rebuilding Paradise (2020) with Hans Zimmer
John Williams
Far and Away (1992)
Solo: A Star Wars Story (2018) – Williams composed the "Han Solo" theme for the film.
Lee Holdridge
Skylark (1980)
Splash (1984)
Hans Zimmer
Backdraft (1991)
Curious George (2006) - Produced by/Score Producer
The Da Vinci Code (2006)
Frost/Nixon (2008)
Angels & Demons (2009)
The Dilemma (2011) with Lorne Balfe
Rush (2013)
Inferno (2016)
Rebuilding Paradise (2020) with Lorne Balfe
Hillbilly Elegy (2020)Reginald HudlinMarcus Miller
House Party (1990)
Boomerang (1992)
The Great White Hype (1996)
The Ladies Man (2000)
Serving Sara (2002)
Everybody Hates Chris (2005-2009) - They contributed on the pilot episode.
Marshall (2017)
Safety (2020)John HughesIra Newborn
Sixteen Candles (1984)
Weird Science (1985)
Ferris Bueller's Day Off (1986)
Some Kind of Wonderful (1987) (Rejected Score)  – Produced by
Planes, Trains and Automobiles (1987)
Uncle Buck (1989)Tim HunterMark Adler
River's Edge (1986) - Adler is credited as music editor.
The Far Side of Jericho (2006)
Looking Glass (2018)
Daniel Licht
Anatomy of a Hate Crime (2001)
Video Voyeur: The Susan Wilson Story (2002)
Paul Buckmaster
The Maker (1997)
Mean Streak (1999)
Pino Donaggio
Tex (1982)
Rescuers: Stories of Courage: Two Families (1998)
Rescuers: Stories of Courage: Two Couples (1998)
Jürgen Knieper
River's Edge (1986)
Paint It Black (1989)John HustonAlex North
The Misfits (1961)
Wise Blood (1979)
Under the Volcano (1984)
Prizzi's Honor (1985)
The Dead (1987)
Hugo Friedhofer
In This Our Life (1942) - Orchestral Arrangements.
The Barbarian and the Geisha (1958)
Jerry Goldsmith
Freud (1962)
The List of Adrian Messenger (1963)
Dimitri Tiomkin
Report from the Aleutians (1943) - Short
The Battle of San Pietro (1945) - Short
Let There Be Light (1946) - Short
Maurice Jarre
The Life and Times of Judge Roy Bean (1972)
The Mackintosh Man (1973)
The Man Who Would Be King (1975)
Adolph Deutsch
The Maltese Falcon (1941)
Across the Pacific (1942)Peter HyamsBruce Broughton
The Presidio (1988)
Narrow Margin (1990)
Stay Tuned (1992)
John Debney
Sudden Death (1995)
The Relic (1997)
End of Days (1999)
Billy Goldenberg
Busting (1974)
Peeper (1975) Rejected Score 
Amazing Stories (1985) Episode "The Amazing Falsworth"
Jerry Goldsmith
Capricorn One (1977)
Outland (1981)
David Shire
2010 (1984)
Beyond a Reasonable Doubt (2009)Nicholas HytnerGeorge Fenton
The Madness of King George (1994)
The Crucible (1996)
The Object of My Affection (1998)
Center Stage (2000)
The History Boys (2006) 
The Lady in the Van (2015)
Alan Bennett's Talking Heads (2020)

 I Hiroyuki ImaishiHiroyuki Sawano
Kill la Kill (2013-2014)
Promare (2019)Otar IosselianiNicolas Zourabichvili
Favorites of the Moon (1984), 
And Then There Was Light (1989)
The Butterfly Hunt (1992)
Brigands-Chapter VII (1996)
Farewell, Home Sweet Home (1999)
Monday Morning (2002)
Gardens in Autumn (2006)
Winter Song (2015)Dan IrelandHarry Gregson-Williams
The Whole Wide World (1996)
Passionada (2002)
Jolene (2008)
Hate from a Distance (2014)Robert IscoveStewart Copeland
She's All That (1999)
Boys and Girls (2000)
Craig Safan
Mission of the Shark: The Saga of the U.S.S. Indianapolis (1991)
Breaking the Silence (1992)
Terror on Track 9 (1992)
Without Consent (1994)
Without Warning (1994)Neal IsraelDavid Kitay
Breaking the Rules (1992)
Surf Ninjas (1993)
Hounded (2001)Jim IssacHarry Manfredini
The Horror Show (1989)
Jason X (2001)James IvoryRichard Robbins
The Europeans (1979)
Jane Austen in Manhattan (1980)
Quartet (1981)
Heat and Dust (1983)
The Bostonians (1984)
A Room With a View (1985)
Maurice (1987)
Slaves of New York (1989)
Mr. & Mrs. Bridge (1990)
Howards End (1992)
The Remains of the Day (1993)
Jefferson in Paris (1995)
Surviving Picasso (1996)
A Soldier's Daughter Never Cries (1998)
The Golden Bowl (2000)
Le Divorce (2003)
The White Countess (2005)

 J Dianne JacksonHoward Blake
The Snowman (1982)
Granpa (1989)Mick JacksonAlan Silvestri
The Bodyguard (1992)
Clean Slate (1994)
Volcano (1997)Peter JacksonPeter Dasent
Meet the Feebles (1989)
Dead Alive (1992)
Heavenly Creatures (1994)
Howard Shore
The Lord of the Rings: The Fellowship of the Ring (2001)
The Lord of the Rings: The Two Towers (2002)
The Lord of the Rings: The Return of the King (2003)
King Kong (2005) Rejected Score
The Hobbit: An Unexpected Journey (2012)
The Hobbit: The Desolation of Smaug (2013)
The Hobbit: The Battle of the Five Armies (2014)Charles JarrottJohn Barry
Mary, Queen of Scots (1971)
The Dove (1974)Barry JenkinsNicholas Britell
Moonlight (2016)
If Beale Street Could Talk (2018)Garth JenningsJoby Talbot
The Hitchhiker's Guide to the Galaxy (2005)
Son of Rambow (2007)
Sing (2016)
Sing 2 (2021)Jean-Pierre JeunetAngelo Badalamenti
The City of Lost Children (1995)
A Very Long Engagement (2004)Norman JewisonDave Grusin
...And Justice for All (1979)
Dinner with Friends (2001)
Frank De Vol
The Thrill of It All (1963)
Send Me No Flowers (1964)
Michel Legrand 
The Thomas Crow Affair (1968)
Best Friends (1982)
Henry Mancini
Gaily, Gaily (1969)
53rd Academy Awards (1981) – Produced byRoland JofféJohn Barry
The Scarlet Letter (1995)
Goodbye Lover (1998) Rejected Score
Ennio Morricone
The Mission (1986)
Fat Man and Little Boy (1989)
City of Joy (1992)
The Scarlet Letter (1995) Rejected Score
Vatel (2000)Rian JohnsonNathan Johnson
Brick (2005)
The Brothers Bloom (2008)
Looper (2012)
Knives Out (2019)
Glass Onion: A Knives Out Mystery (2022)Joe JohnstonDon Davis
The Pagemaster (1994) - Orchestrator.
Jurassic Park III (2001)
James Horner
Honey, I Shrunk the Kids (1989)
The Rocketeer (1991)
The Pagemaster (1994)
Jumanji (1995)
James Newton Howard 
Hidalgo (2004)
The Nutcracker and the Four Realms (2018)Lamont JohnsonGil Melle
My Sweet Charlie (1970)
You'll Like My Mother (1972)
That Certain Summer (1972)
Charles Fox
The Last American Hero (1973)
One on One (1977)
Voices Within: The Lives of Truddi Chase (1990)
Crash Landing: The Rescue of Flight 232 (1972)
The Broken Chain (1993)
The Man Next Door (1996)Tim JohnsonHarry Gregson-Williams
Antz (1998)
Sinbad: Legend of the Seven Seas (2003)
Rupert Gregson-Williams
Over the Hedge (2006)
Abominable (2019) - Executive ProducerDuncan JonesClint Mansell
Moon (2009)
Mute (2018)Harmon JonesLionel Newman
The Silver Whip (1953)
Princess of the Nile (1954)Spike JonzeCarter Burwell
Being John Malkovich (1999)
Adaptation (2002)
Where the Wild Things Are (2009)Glenn JordanLeonard Rosenman
Heartsounds (1984)
Aftermath: A Test of Love (1991)
David Shire
Only When I Laugh (1981)
Promise (1986)
Echoes in the Darkness (1987)
Jesse (1988)
Sarah, Plain and Tall (1991)
The Boys (1991)
Jane's House (1994)
My Brother's Keeper (1995)
Jack's Women (1996)
Sarah, Plain and Tall: Winter's End (1999)
Billy Goldenberg
The Lives of Benjamin Franklin (1974-1975)
One of My Wives Is Missing (1976)
The Family Man (1979)
The Women's Room (1980)
Bruce Broughton
O Pioneers! (1992)
Night Ride Home (1999)
Lucy (2003)
Bill Conti
The Displaced Person (1977)
Mass Appeal (1984)
Michel Colombier
Mary & Tim (1996)
The Long Way Home (1998)Neil JordanAnne Dudley
The Miracle (1991)
The Crying Game (1992)
George Fenton
The Company of Wolves (1984)
High Spirits (1988)
We're No Angels (1989)
Interview with the Vampire (1994) Rejected Score
Javier Navarrete
Byzantium (2012)
Greta (2018)
Elliot Goldenthal
Interview with the Vampire (1994)
Michael Collins (1996)
The Butcher Boy (1997)
In Dreams (1999)
The Good Thief (2002)Mike JudgeJohn Frizzell
Beavis and Butt-Head Do America (1996)
King of the Hill (1997–2010) - Executive Producer
Office Space (1999)
Silicon Valley (2014)
Mike Judge Presents: Tales from the Tour Bus (2017)
Beavis and Butt-Head Do the Universe (2022)

 K Jeremy KaganBruce Broughton
The Ballad of Lucy Whipple (2001)
Bobbie's Girl (2002)
Well Played (2013) Short
Shot (2017)
Bill Conti
The Big Fix (1978)
By The Sword (1991)
Elmer Bernstein
The Chosen (1981)
The Journey of Natty Gann (1985) Rejected ScoreShusuke KanekoKow Otani
My Soul Is Slashed (1991)
No Worries on the Recruit Front (1991)
Graduation Journey: I Came from Japan (1993)
It's a Summer Vacation Everyday (1994)
Gamera: Guardian of the Universe (1995)
Gamera 2: Attack of Legion (1996)
Haunted School 3 (1997)
Gamera 3: The Revenge of Iris (1999)
Pyrokinesis (2000)
Godzilla, Mothra and King Ghidorah: Giant Monsters All-Out Attack (2001)Jonathan KaplanJames Horner
Project X (1987)
Unlawful Entry (1992)
Brad Fiedel
Girls of the White Orchid (1983)
The Accused (1988)
Immediate Family (1989)
Jerry Goldsmith
Love Field (1992)
Bad Girls (1994)
David Nichtern
The Student Teachers (1973)
White Line Fever (1975)
Hummie Mann
Reform School Girl (1994)
Picture Windows (1994) Segment: "Language of the Heart"Phil KarlsonWalter Scharf
Ben (1972)
Walking Tall (1973)
Elmer Bernstein
The Young Doctors (1961)
Rampage (1963)
The Silencers (1966)
George Duning
Lorna Doone (1951)
Scandal Sheet (1952)
Tight Spot (1955)
5 Against the House (1955)
The Brothers Rico (1957)
Gunman's Walk (1958)Jake KasdanMichael Andrews
Orange County (2002)
The TV Set (2006)
Walk Hard: The Dewey Cox Story (2007)
Bad Teacher (2011)
Sex Tape (2014)
Henry Jackman
Jumanji: Welcome to the Jungle (2017)
Jumanji: The Next Level (2019)Lawrence KasdanBruce Broughton
Silverado (1985)
Cross My Heart (1987) - Produced by
The Accidental Tourist (1988) Rejected Score 
James Newton Howard
Grand Canyon (1991)
Wyatt Earp (1994)
French Kiss (1995)
Mumford (1999)
Dreamcatcher (2003)
Darling Companion (2012)
Light & Magic (2022)Kazuyoshi KatayamaToshihiko Sahashi
The Big O (1999-2003)
King of Thorn (2009)Lloyd KaufmanEthan Hurt
Class of Nuke 'Em High (1986)
Return to Nuke 'Em High Volume 1 (2013)
Return to Nuke 'Em High Volume 2 (2014)
Christopher De Marco
Troma's War (1988)
The Toxic Avenger Part III: The Last Temptation of Toxie (1989)Elia KazanAlex North
People of the Cumberland (1937) Short
A Streetcar Named Desire (1951)
Viva Zapata! (1952)
David Amram
Splendor in the Grass (1961)
The Arrangement (1969)
Alfred Newman
A Tree Grows in Brooklyn (1945)
Boomerang (1947) - Newman is credited as musical director.
Gentleman's Agreement (1947)
Pinky (1949)
Panic in the Streets (1950)
Viva Zapata! (1952) - Newman is credited as musical director.
Kenyon Hopkins
Baby Doll (1956)
Wild River (1960)Jennifer KentJed Kurzel
The Babadook (2014)
The Nightingale (2018)Irwin KershnerBernardo Segall
The Luck of Ginger Coffey (1964)
Loving (1970)
John Williams
Kraft Suspense Theatre (1963-1965) - They collaborated on one episode of the series.
Star Wars: Episode V - The Empire Strikes Back (1980)
Jerry Goldsmith
Cain's Hundred (1961-1962) - They collaborated on an episode of the series.
The Flim-Flam Man (1967)
S*P*Y*S (1974)
David Shire
Raid on Entebbe (1977)
Amazing Stories (1986) Episode: "Hell Toupee"
Richard Markowitz
The Hoodlum Priest (1961)
Face in the Rain (1963)Bruce KesslerStu Phillips
The Monkees (1966)
Angels from Hell (1968)
The Gay Deceivers (1969)
Simon, King of the Witches (1971)
McCloud (1970)
Get Christie Love! (1974)
Switch (1975)
Quincy M.E. (1976 to 1982) - They collaborated on an episode. 
B.J. and the Bear (1980)
The Misadventures of Sheriff Lobo (1980)
The Fall Guy (1981)Krzysztof KieślowskiZbigniew Preisner
No End (1984)
A Short Film About Killing (1988)
The Decalogue (1988)
The Double Life of Véronique (1991)
Three Colors: Blue (1993)
Three Colors: White (1993)
Three Colors: Red (1993)Henry KingFranz Waxman
Untamed (1955)
Beloved Infidel (1959) 
Alfred Newman
Ramona (1936)
Alexander's Ragtime Band (1938)
Little Old New York (1940)
A Yank in the RAF (1941)
Remember the Day (1941)
The Black Swan (1942)
The Song of Bernadette (1943) 
Wilson (1944)
A Bell for Adano (1945)
Margie (1946) 
Captain from Castile (1947) 
Prince of Foxes (1949)
Twelve O'Clock High (1949)
The Gunfighter (1950)
David and Bathsheba (1951)
Wait till the Sun Shines, Nellie (1952) 
O. Henry's Full House (1952) Segment "The Gift of the Migi"
Love Is a Many-Splendored Thing (1955) 
Carousel (1956)
The Bravados (1958)
Cyril J. Mockridge
Way Down East (1935) - Mockridge is an uncredited composer.
The Country Doctor (1936) - Mockridge is an uncredited composer.
Seventh Heaven (1937) - Mockridge is an uncredited composer.
In Old Chicago (1938) - Mockridge is an uncredited composer.
Stanley and Livingstone (1939) - Mockridge is an uncredited composer.
Remember the Day (1941) - Mockridge is an uncredited composer.
Deep Waters (1948)
Lionel Newman
I'd Climb the Highest Mountain (1951) - Musical Director
Love Is a Many-Splendored Thing (1955) - Newman is an uncredited conductor.
The Sun Also Rises (1957) - Conductor
The Bravados (1958)
Bernard Herrmann
The Snows of Kilimanjaro (1952)
King of the Khyber Rifles (1953)
Tender Is the Night (1962)
Hugo Friedhofer
Way Down East (1935) - Friedhofer is an uncredited composer.
Ramona (1936) - Friedhofer is an uncredited orchestrator.
Remember the Day (1941) - Friedhofer is an uncredited composer.
The Sun Also Rises (1957)
The Bravados (1958) - Friedhofer is an uncredited composer.
This Earth Is Mine (1959)Takesi KitanoJoe Hisaishi
A Scene at the Sea (1991)
Sonatine (1993)
Getting Any? (1995)
Kids Return (1996)
Hana-bi (1997)
Kikujiro (1999)
Brother (2000)
Dolls (2002)
Keiichi Suzuki
Zatōichi (2003)
Outrage (2010)
Beyond Outrage (2012)
Ryuzo and the Seven Henchmen (2015)
Outrage Coda (2017)Randal KleiserBruce Broughton
Honey, I Blew Up the Kid (1992)
Honey, I Shrunk the Audience! (1994)
Basil Poledouris
The Blue Lagoon (1980)
Summer Lovers (1982)
White Fang (1991)
It's My Party (1996)
Greg O'Connor
The Speech JFK Never Gave (2017) Short
Defrost: The Virtual Series (TBA) 
Mark Snow
The Rookies (1972–1976) – They collaborated on one episode.
The Boy in the Plastic Bubble (1976)Walter KlenhardShirley Walker
The Haunting of Seacliff Inn (1994)
Baby Monitor: Sound of Fear (1998)
Disappearance (2002)Travis KnightDario Marianelli
The Boxtrolls (2014)
Kubo and the Two Strings (2016)
Bumblebee (2018)
Wildwood (2023)Masaki KobayashiToru Takemitsu
The Inheritance (1962)
Harakiri (1962)
Kwaidan (1964)
Samurai Rebellion (1967)
Hymn to a Tired Man (1968)
Inn of Evil (1971)
The Fossil (1975)
Glowing Autumn (1979)
Tokyo Trial (1983)
Family Without a Dinner Table (1985)David KoeppGeoff Zanelli
Secret Window (2004) with Philip Glass
Ghost Town (2008)
Mortdecai (2015) with Mark Ronson
You Should Have Left (2020)
James Newton Howard
The Trigger Effect (1996)
Stir of Echoes (1999)Satoshi KonSusumu Hirasawa
Millennium Actress (2001)
Paranoia Agent (2004)
Paprika (2006)
Dreaming MachineAndrei KonchalovskyEduard Artemyev
Siberiade (1979) 
Homer and Eddie (1989)
The Inner Circle (1991)
House of Fools (2002)
Gloss (2007)
The Nutcracker in 3D (2010) 
The Postman's White Nights (2014)
Sin (2019)Zoltan Korda 
Miklós Rózsa
The Drum (1938) - Rózsa composed additional music for the film. 
The Four Feathers (1939)
The Jungle Book (1942)
Sahara (1943)
The Macomber Affair (1947)
A Woman's Vengeance (1948)Joseph KosinskiJoseph Trapanese
Tron: Legacy (2010) - with Daft Punk
Oblivion (2013)
Only the Brave (2017)
Spiderhead (2022)Henry KosterFranz Waxman
My Cousin Rachel (1952)
The Virgin Queen (1955)
The Story of Ruth (1960)
Alfred Newman
My Blue Heaven (1950)
Elopement (1951) with Cyril J. Mockridge.
O. Henry's Full House (1952) Segment "The Cop and the Anthem"
The Robe (1953)
Désirée (1954) - Newman composed the waltz.Stanley KramerGeorge Antheil
Not as a Stranger (1955)
The Pride and the Passion (1957)
Ernest Gold
The Defiant Ones (1958)
On the Beach (1959)
Inherit the Wind (1960)
Judgment at Nuremberg (1961)
Pressure Point (1962) - Produced by 
It's a Mad, Mad, Mad, Mad World (1963)
Ship of Fools (1965)
The Secret of Santa Vittoria (1969)
The Runner Stumbles (1979)Stanley KubrickGerald Fried
Day of the Fight (1951) - Short
Fear and Desire (1953)
Killer's Kiss (1955)
The Killing (1956)
Paths of Glory (1957)
Wendy Carlos
A Clockwork Orange (1971)
The Shining (1980)
Alex North
Spartacus (1960)
2001: A Space Odyssey (1968) Rejected ScoreBuzz KulikMichel Legrand
Brian's Song (1971)
Cage Without a Key (1975)
The Hunter (1980)
Georges Delerue
Women of Valor (1986)
Her Secret Life (1987)
Billy Goldenberg
The Lindbergh Kidnapping Case (1976)
Rage of Angels (1983)
Kate & Abel (1985)
Around the World in 80 Days (1989)
Lucky Chances (1990)
Miles from Nowhere (1992)
Laurence Rosenthal
Portrait: A Man Whose Name Was John (1974)
George Washington (1984)
Jerry Goldsmith
Climax! (1954-1958) – They collaborated on one episode in the series.
Playhouse 90 (1956-1959) – They collaborated on one episode in the series.
Have Gun - Will Travel (1957-1963) – They collaborated on one episode in the series.
Dr. Kildare (1961–1966) – They collaborated on one episode in the series.
Warning Shot (1967)
Shamus (1973)
Babe (1975)
Elmer Bernstein
Owen Marshall, Counselor at Law (1971-1974) - They collaborated on the TV movie.
Incident on a Dark Street (1973)
Walter Scharf
A Storm in Summer (1970)
From Here to Eternity (1979)
John Williams
Kraft Suspense Theatre (1963-1965) – They collaborated on a two-part episode in the series premiere.
Sergeant Ryker (1968)Roger KumbleEdward Shearmur
Cruel Intentions (1999)
Manchester Prep (1999)
The Sweetest Thing (2002)
College Road Trip (2008)
Furry Vengeance (2010)
Cruel Intentions (2016)
Falling Inn Love (2019)Akira KurosawaTadashi Hattori
The Men Who Tread on the Tiger's Tail (1945)
No Regrets for Our Youth (1946)	
Fumio Hayasaka
Drunken Angel (1948)
Stray Dog (1949)
Scandal (1950)
Rashomon (1950)
The Idiot (1951)
Ikiru (1952)
Seven Samurai (1954)
I Live in Fear (1955) - Masaru Sato composed the second half.
Shinichiro Ikebe
Kagemusha (1980)
Dreams (1990)
Rhapsody in August (1991)
Madadayo (1993)
Masaru Sato
Throne of Blood (1957)
The Lower Depths (1957)
The Hidden Fortress (1958)
The Bad Sleep Well (1960)
Yojimbo (1961)
Sanjuro (1962)
High and Low (1963)
Red Beard (1965)
Seiichi Suzuki
Sanshiro Sugata (1943)
The Most Beautiful (1944)
Sanshiro Sugata Part II (1945)
Toru Takemitsu
Dodes'ka-den (1970)
Ran (1985)Justin KurzelJed Kurzel
Snowtown (2011)
Macbeth (2015)
Assassin's Creed (2016) Karyn KusamaTheodore Shapiro
Girlfight (2000)
Jennifer's Body (2009)
The Invitation (2015)
Destroyer (2018)Emir KusturicaGoran Bregovic
Time of the Gypsies (1988)
Arizona Dream (1993)
Underground (1995)Ken KwapisCliff Eidelman
The Beautician and the Beast (1997)
Sexual Life (2005)
The Sisterhood of the Travelling Pants (2005)
He's Just Not That Into You (2009)
Big Miracle (2012)

 L Aldo LadoEnnio Morricone
La corta notte delle bambole di vetro (1971) 
Who Saw Her Die? (1972)
La cosa buffa (1972)
L'ultimo treno della notte (1975) 
L'umanoid (1979) 
La disubbidienza (1981)Mary LambertJeff Rona
The In Crowd (2000)
Urban Legends: Bloody Mary (2005) with Scooter Pietsch.
Elliot Goldenthal
Pet Sematary (1989)
Grand Isle (1991)Peter LandesmanJames Newton Howard
Parkland (2013)
Concussion (2015)John LandisElmer Bernstein
Animal House (1978)
The Blues Brothers (1980) - Bernstein composed the God theme.
An American Werewolf in London (1981)
Trading Places (1983)
Thriller (1983)
Spies Like Us (1985)
Three Amigos (1986)
Oscar (1991)
Innocent Blood (1992) Rejected Score 
Ira Newborn
The Blues Brothers (1980)
Into the Night (1985)
George Burns Comedy Week (1985) – They contributed on one episode.
Amazon Women on the Moon (1987)
Innocent Blood (1992)
Peter Bernstein
Animal House (1978) - Bernstein is an uncredited orchestrator.
Trading Places (1983) - Orchestrator.
Thriller (1983) - Bernstein is an uncredited orchestrator.
Blues Brothers 2000 (1998) - Bernstein produced one of the film's songs: "Let There Be Drums".
Susan's Plan (1998)
Honey, I Shrunk the Kids: The TV Show (1999) Episode: "Honey, Name That Tune"
Nile Rodgers
Coming to America (1988)
Beverly Hills Cop III (1994)Fritz LangMiklos Rozsa
Ministry of Fear (1944)
Secret Beyond the Door (1946)
Moonfleet (1955)
Franz Waxman
Liliom (1934)
Fury (1936)Walter LangCyril J. Mockridge
Second Honeymoon (1937)
I'll Give a Million (1938)
The Little Princess (1939)
The Great Profile (1940)
The Magnificent Dope (1942)
Claudia and David (1946)
Sentimental Journey (1946)
Cheaper by the Dozen (1950)
Desk Set (1957)
Alfred Newman
The Blue Bird (1940)
Tin Pan Alley (1940)
Song of the Islands (1942)
Sitting Pretty (1948)
When My Baby Smiles at Me (1948)
You're My Everything (1949)
On the Riviera (1951)
With a Song in My Heart (1952)
Call Me Madam (1953)
Lionel Newman
Cheaper by the Dozen (1950) - Musical Director
The Jackpot (1950)
There's No Business Like Show Business (1954)John LasseterRandy Newman
Toy Story (1995)
A Bug's Life (1998)
Toy Story 2 (1999)
Monsters, Inc. (2001) - Executive Producer
Cars (2006)
The Princess and the Frog (2009) - Executive Producer
Toy Story 3 (2010) - Story by
Monsters University (2013) - Executive Producer
Cars 3 (2017) - Executive Producer
Toy Story 4 (2019) - Story byFrancis LawrenceJames Newton Howard
I Am Legend (2007)
Water for Elephants (2011)
The Hunger Games: Catching Fire (2013)
The Hunger Games: Mockingjay – Part 1 (2014)
The Hunger Games: Mockingjay – Part 2 (2015)
Red Sparrow (2018)
The Hunger Games: The Ballad of Songbirds and Snakes (2023)Arnold LavenElmer Bernstein
Anna Lucasta (1958)
The Big Valley (1965–1969) – They contributed two episodes in the series.
The Scalphunters (1968) – Produced by
Herschel Burke Gilbert
Without Warning! (1952)
Vice Squad (1953)
Racket Squad (1950–1953) – They contributed on one episode.
Slaughter on Tenth Avenue (1957) – Gilbert is an uncredited composer.
The Detectives (1959–1962) – They contributed a few episodes.
The Rifleman (1958–1963) – They contributed some episodes that Laven directed.
Sam Whiskey (1969)David LeanMalcolm Arnold
The Sound Barrier (1952)
Hobson's Choice (1954)
The Bridge on the River Kwai (1957)
Maurice Jarre
Lawrence of Arabia (1962)
Doctor Zhivago (1965)
Ryan's Daughter (1970)
A Passage to India (1984)
Clifton Parker
In Which We Serve (1942)
This Happy Breed (1944)Ang LeeMychael Danna
The Ice Storm (1997)
Ride with the Devil (1999)
Life of Pi (2012)
Billy Lynn's Long Halftime Walk (2016)
Danny Elfman
Hulk (2003)
Taking Woodstock (2009)
Mader
The Wedding Banquet (1993)
Eat Drink Man Woman (1994)Malcolm D. LeeStanley Clarke
The Best Man (1999)
Undercover Brother (2002)
Roll Bounce (2005)
Soul Men (2008)
The Best Man Holiday (2013)
Barbershop: The Next Cut (2016)
David Newman
Welcome Home, Roscoe Jenkins (2008)
Girls Trip (2017)
Night School (2018)Spike LeeTerence Blanchard
School Daze (1988) - Blanchard was credited as musician.
Do the Right Thing (1989) - Blanchard was credited as musician.
Mo' Better Blues (1990) - Blanchard was an uncredited composer.
Jungle Fever (1991)
Malcolm X (1992)
Crooklyn (1994)
Clockers (1995)
Get on the Bus (1996)
4 Little Girls (1997)
Summer of Sam (1999)
Bamboozled (2000)
Love & Basketball (2000) – Produced by
25th Hour (2002)
Jim Brown: All-American (2002)
She Hate Me (2004)
Sucker Free City (2004)
All the Invisible Children (2005) - They did contribute a segment.
Inside Man (2006)
When the Levees Broke: A Requiem in Four Acts (2006)
Miracle at St. Anna (2008)
If God Is Willing and da Creek Don't Rise (2010)
Chi-Raq (2015)
BlacKkKlansman (2018)
Da 5 Bloods (2020)
NYC Epicenters 9/11→2021½ (2021)
Bill Lee
Joe's Bed-Stuy Barbershop: We Cut Hair (1983)
She's Gotta Have It (1986)
School Daze (1988)
Do the Right Thing (1989)
Mo' Better Blues (1990)Michael LembeckGeorge S. Clinton
The Santa Clause 2 (2002)
The Santa Clause 3: The Escape Clause (2006)
The Clique (2008)
Tooth Fairy (2010)
Sharpay's Fabulous Adventure (2011)Kasi LemmonsTerence Blanchard
Eve's Bayou (1997)
The Caveman's Valentine (2001)
Talk to Me (2007)
Harriet (2019)
I Wanna Dance with Somebody (2022)David LeitchTyler Bates
John Wick (2014) – Produced by
John Wick: Chapter 2 (2017) — Executive Producer
Atomic Blonde (2017)
Deadpool 2 (2018)
John Wick: Chapter 3 – Parabellum (2019) — Executive Producer
Hobbs & Shaw (2019)Robert Z. LeonardJohnny Green
Week-End at the Waldorf (1945)
Cynthia (1947) - Musical Numbers
Herbert Stothart
In Gay Madrid (1930)
Peg o' My Heart (1933)
Naughty Marietta (1935)
Maytime (1937)
The Girl of the Golden West (1938)
Broadway Serenade (1939)
Pride and Prejudice (1940)
New Moon (1940)
Ziegfeld Girl (1941)Tony LeondisPatrick Doyle
Igor (2008)
The Emoji Movie (2017)Sergio LeoneAngelo Francesco Lavagnino
The Last Days of Pompeii (1959)
The Colossus of Rhodes (1961)
Ennio Morricone
A Fistful of Dollars (1964)
For a Few Dollars More (1965)
The Good, the Bad and the Ugly (1966)
Once Upon a Time in the West (1968)
Duck, You Sucker! (1971)
My Name Is Nobody (1973)
A Genius, Two Partners and a Dupe (1975)
Once Upon a Time in America (1984)Mervyn LeRoyAdolph Deutsch
They Won't Forget (1937)
Little Women (1949) with Max Steiner.
Million Dollar Mermaid (1952)
Herbert Stothart
The Wizard of Oz (1939) - Produced by
Waterloo Bridge (1940)
Blossoms in the Dust (1941)
Random Harvest (1942)
Madame Curie (1943)
Thirty Seconds Over Tokyo (1944)Umberto LenziFranco Micalizzi
Syndicate Sadists (1975)
The Tough Ones (1976) 
Violent Naples (1976)
The Cynic, the Rat and the Fist (1977)
The Biggest Battle (1978)
La banda del gobbo (1978)
From Corleone to Brooklyn (1979)
Scusi, lei è normale? (1979)
Black Demons (1991)
Hunt for the Golden Scorpion (1991)
Mean Tricks (1992)Richard LesterJohn Barry
The Knack ...and How to Get It (1965)
Petulia (1968)
Robin and Marian (1976)
Ken Thorne
Help! (1965) - Musical director / Additional music
A Funny Thing Happened on the Way to the Forum (1966)
How I Won the War (1967)
The Bed Sitting Room (1969)
Juggernaut (1974)
Royal Flash (1975) - Conductor
The Ritz (1976) 
Superman II (1980)
Superman III (1983)
Finders Keepers (1984)
Patrick Williams
Butch and Sundance: The Early Days (1979)
Cuba (1980)
Michel Legrand
The Three Musketeers (1973)
Robin and Marian (1976) Rejected ScoreRob LettermanHenry Jackman
Monsters vs. Aliens (2009)
Gulliver's Travels (2010)
Pokémon: Detective Pikachu (2019)Brian LevantRandy Edelman
Beethoven (1992)
Max 2: White House Hero (2017)
David Newman
The Flintstones (1994)
Jingle All the Way (1996)
The Flintstones in Viva Rock Vegas (2000)
Are We There Yet? (2005)
Scooby-Doo! The Mystery Begins (2009)
The Spy Next Door (2010)
Scooby-Doo! Curse of the Lake Monster (2010)
A Christmas Story 2 (2012)Henry LevinMischa Bakaleinikoff
Cry of the Werewolf (1944)
Sergeant Mike (1944)
Mario Castelnuovo-Tedesco
Dancing in Manhattan (1944)
I Love a Mystery (1945)
Night Editor (1946)
George Duning
The Guilt of Janet Ames (1947)
The Corpse Came C.O.D. (1947)
The Gallant Blade (1948)
The Man from Colorado (1948)
Jolson Sings Again (1949)
And Baby Makes Three (1949)
Convicted (1950)
The Petty Girl (1950)
The Flying Missile (1950)
Two of a Kind (1951)
The Family Secret (1951)
Leigh Harline
The Remarkable Mr. Pennypacker (1959)
Holiday for Lovers (1959)
The Wonderful World of the Brothers Grimm (1962)
Cyril J. Mockridge
Belles on Their Toes (1952)
The Farmer Takes a Wife (1953)
Mister Scoutmaster (1953)
Alfred Newman
The President's Lady (1953)
April Love (1957)
Lionel Newman
Three Young Texans (1954)
The Gambler from Natchez (1954)
Bernardine (1957)Barry LevinsonEnnio Morricone
Bugsy (1991)
Disclosure (1994)
Randy Newman
The Natural (1984)
Avalon (1990)
Marcelo Zarvos
What Just Happened (2008)
30 for 30 (2009–2014) - They did contribute an episode to the series.
You Don't Know Jack (2010)
The Bay (2012)
The Humbling (2014)
Rock the Kasbah (2015)
Hans Zimmer
Rain Man (1988)
Toys (1992)
An Everlasting Piece (2000)
The Survivor (2021)Shawn LevyChristophe Beck
Big Fat Liar (2002)
Just Married (2003)
Cheaper by the Dozen (2003)
The Pink Panther (2006)
What Happens in Vegas (2008) - Produced by
The Pink Panther 2 (2009) - Executive Producer
Date Night (2010)
Little Brother (2012)
The Watch (2012) – Produced by
The Internship (2013)
Alexander and the Terrible, Horrible,No Good, Very Bad Day (2014) – Produced by
Free Guy (2021)
Alan Silvestri
Night at the Museum (2006)
Night at the Museum: Battle of the Smithsonian (2009)
Night at the Museum: Secret of the Tomb (2014)Jerry LewisLou Brown
Three on a Couch (1966)
Which Way to the Front? (1970)
Walter Scharf
The Jerry Lewis Show (1958)
The Bellboy (1960)
The Ladies Man (1961)
The Errand Boy (1961)
The Nutty Professor (1963)
Morton Stevens
Hardly Working (1980)
Cracking Up (1983)
Pete King
The Family Jewels (1965)
Which Way to the Front? (1970) - King is an uncredited composer.Herschell Gordon LewisLarry Wellington
Bell, Bare and Beautiful (1963) 
Two Thousand Maniacs! (1964)
Jimmy, the Boy Wonder (1966) 
A Taste of Blood (1967) - Musical director. 
The Gruesome Twosome (1967)
The Girl, the Body, and the Pill (1967) - Musical director 
Blast-Off Girls (1967)
She-Devils on Wheels (1968) - Background music. 
Just for the Hell of It (1968)
Linda and Abilene (1969) as Warren Regan
Miss Nymphet's Zap-In (1970) - Music Coordinator.
The Wizard of Gore (1970)
The Gore Gore Girls (1972) - Music Coordinator.Robert Michael LewisCharles Fox
A Summer to Remember (1985)
Deep Dark Secret (1987)Jonathan LiebesmanBrian Tyler
Darkness Falls (2003)
The Killing Room (2009)
Battle: Los Angeles (2011)
Teenage Mutant Ninja Turtles (2014)Kevin LimaBruce Broughton
Eloise at the Plaza (2003)
Eloise at Christmastime (2003)Doug LimanChristophe Beck
Edge of Tomorrow (2014)
American Made (2017)
John Powell
The Bourne Identity (2002)
The Bourne Supremacy (2004) - Executive Producer
Mr. & Mrs. Smith (2005)
The Bourne Ultimatum (2007) - Executive Producer
Jumper (2008)
Fair Game (2010)
Jason Bourne (2016) - Executive Producer
Locked Down (2021)Justin LinBrian Tyler
Annapolis (2006)
The Fast and the Furious: Tokyo Drift (2006)
Finishing the Game (2007)
Fast & Furious (2009)
Fast Five (2011)
Scorpion (2014) Pilot
Magnum P.I. (2018) Pilot
F9 (2021)Richard LinklaterGraham Reynolds
A Scanner Darkly  (2006)
Bernie (2011)
Up to Speed (2012)
Before Midnight (2013)
Last Flag Flying (2017)
Where'd You Go, Bernadette (2018)Dwight H. LittleMisha Segal
KGB: The Secret War
The Phantom of the Opera (1989 film) 
Natty Knocks (2022)
Christopher Young
Getting Even (1986 film)
Rapid Fire (1992 film)
Murder at 1600Ken LoachGeorge Fenton
Ladybird Ladybird (1994) 
Land and Freedom (1995) 
Carla's Song (1996)
My Name is Joe (1998)
Bread and Roses (2000)
The Navigators (2001)
Sweet Sixteen (2002)
Ae Fond Kiss... (2004)
Tickets (2005)
The Wind That Shakes the Barley (2006)
It's a Free World... (2007)
Looking for Eric (2009)
Route Irish (2010)
The Angels' Share (2012)
Jimmy's Hall (2014)
I, Daniel Blake (2016)
Sorry We Missed You (2019)Joshua LoganGeorge Duning
Picnic (1955)
Ensign Pulver (1964)Ulli LommelElliot Goldenthal
Cocaine Cowboys (1979)
Blank Generation (1980)Peter LordHarry Gregson-Williams
Chicken Run (2000)
Flushed Away (2006) - Produced by
Arthur Christmas (2011) - Produced by
Early Man (2018) - Produced byPhil Lord & Christopher MillerMark Mothersbaugh
Cloudy with a Chance of Meatballs (2009)
21 Jump Street (2012)
Cloudy with a Chance of Meatballs 2 (2013) - Executive Producers
The Lego Movie (2014)
22 Jump Street (2014)
The Last Man on Earth (2015)
The Lego Ninjago Movie (2017) - Produced by
The Lego Movie 2: The Second Part (2019) - Produced by
The Mitchells vs. the Machines (2021) - Produced by
America: The Motion Picture (2021) - Produced by
Cocaine Bear (2023)David LoweryDaniel Hart
St. Nick (2009)
Ain't Them Bodies Saints (2013) 
Pete's Dragon (2016)
A Ghost Story (2017) 
The Old Man and the Gun (2018) 
Green Knight (2021)
Peter Pan & Wendy (2023)George LucasJohn Williams
Star Wars: Episode IV – A New Hope (1977)
Star Wars: Episode I – The Phantom Menace (1999)
Star Wars: Episode II – Attack of the Clones (2002)
Star Wars: Episode III – Revenge of the Sith (2005)Jon Lucas & Scott MooreChristopher Lennertz
Bad Moms (2016) 
A Bad Moms Christmas (2017)
Jexi (2019) with Philip WhiteBaz LuhrmannElliott Wheeler
The Get Down (2016) - They collaborated on one episode. 
Elvis (2022)

Craig Armstrong
Romeo + Juliet (1996) with Nellee Hooper & Marius de Vries
Moulin Rouge! (2001)
Chanel No. 5: The Film (2004) short
The Great Gatsby (2013)Sidney LumetHoward Shore
Guilty as Sin (1993)
Gloria (1999)
Cy Coleman
Garbo Talks (1984)
Power (1986)
Paul Chihara
Prince of the City (1981)
The Morning After (1986)
100 Centre Street (2001-2002) - They contributed two episodes in the series.
Strip Search (2004)
Quincy Jones
The Pawnbroker (1964)
The Deadly Affair (1966)
Last of the Mobile Hot Shots (1970)
The Anderson Tapes (1971)
The Wiz (1978)
Johnny Mandel
The Verdict (1982)
Deathtrap (1982)
Kenyon Hopkins
12 Angry Men (1957)
The Fugitive Kind (1960)
Richard Rodney Bennett
Murder on the Orient Express (1974)
Equus (1977)Rod LurieLarry Groupe
Deterrence (1999)
The Contender (2000) 
Line of Fire (2003)
Commander in Chief (2005)
Resurrecting the Champ (2007)
Nothing But the Truth (2008)
Straw Dogs (2011)
Monsters of God (2017) - TV Pilot
The Outpost (2019)William LustigJay Chattaway
Maniac (1980)
Vigilante (1983)
Maniac Cop (1988)
Relentless (1989)
Maniac Cop 2 (1990)
Maniac Cop III: Badge of Silence (1993) - In addition to the Joel Goldsmith score, some stock music by Chattaway was used.David LynchAngelo Badalamenti
Blue Velvet (1986)
Wild at Heart (1990)
Industrial Symphony No. 1 (1990) with David Lynch.
Twin Peaks (1990–1991; 2017)
On the Air (1992) - They contributed one episode of the series premiere.
Hotel Room (1993) - They contributed two episodes of the miniseries.
Twin Peaks: Fire Walk with Me (1992)
Lost Highway (1997)
The Straight Story (1999)
Mulholland Drive (2001)
Rabbits (2002)
Darkened Room (2002)
Himself
Eraserhead (1977)
Blue Velvet (1986) – additional music
Wild at Heart (1990) – additional music
Industrial Symphony No. 1 (1990) with Angelo Badalamenti.
Mulholland Drive (2001) – additional music
Lady Blue Shanghai (2010)Adrian LyneMaurice Jarre
Fatal Attraction (1987)
Jacob's Ladder (1990)
Giorgio Moroder
Foxes (1980)
Flashdance (1983)Jonathan LynnRandy Edelman
My Cousin Vinny (1992)
The Distinguished Gentleman (1992)
Greedy (1994)
The Whole Nine Yards (2000) With Gary Gold.

 M Seth MacFarlaneWalter Murphy
Family Guy (1999–present) - Executive Producer
American Dad! (2005–present) - Executive Producer
Cavalcade of Cartoon Comedy (2008-2009) - Executive Producer
The Cleveland Show (2009-2013) - Executive Producer
Ted (2012)
Ted 2 (2015)
Joel McNeely
American Dad! (2008–present) - Executive Producer
A Million Ways to Die in the West (2014)
The Orville (2017–present) - Executive ProducerJohn MaddenThomas Newman
The Debt (2011)
The Best Exotic Marigold Hotel (2012)
The Second Best Exotic Marigold Hotel (2015)
Operation Mincemeat (2022)
Stephen Warbeck
Prime Suspect (1995)
Truth or Dare (1996)
Mrs. Brown (1997)
Shakespeare in Love (1998)
Captain Corelli's Mandolin (2001)
Proof (2005)Terrence MalickHanan Townshend
The Tree of Life (2011) - Adapter
To the Wonder (2012)
Knight of Cups (2015)
Song to Song (2017) - Additional music.William Malone 
Nicholas Pike
Tales from the Crypt (1994) - They collaborated on an episode. 
W.E.I.R.D. World (1995)
Feardotcom (2002)
Masters of Horror (2006) - Fair-Haired Child
Parasomnia (2008)David MametAlaric Jans
House of Games (1987)
Things Change (1988)
Homicide (1991)
The Winslow Boy (1999)
Theodore Shapiro
State and Main (2000)
Heist (2001)James MangoldMarco Beltrami
3:10 to Yuma (2007)
The Wolverine (2013)
Logan (2017)
Ford v. Ferrari (2019)Joseph L. MankiewiczBernard Herrmann
The Ghost and Mrs. Muir (1947)
5 Fingers (1952)
Alfred Newman
The Keys of the Kingdom (1944) – Produced by
Dragonwyck (1946)
The Late George Apley (1947) – Musical Director
A Letter to Three Wives (1949)
No Way Out (1950)
All About Eve (1950)
People Will Talk (1951)
John Addison
The Honey Pot (1967)
Sleuth (1972)
Cyril J. Mockridge
The Late George Apley (1947)
Guys and Dolls (1955) – Background MusicDaniel MannGeorge Duning
Who's Got the Action? (1962)
Who's Been Sleeping in My Bed? (1963)
Alex North
The Rose Tattoo (1955)
I'll Cry Tomorrow (1955)
Hot Spell (1958)
A Dream of Kings (1969)
Willard (1971)
Lost in the Stars (1974) - Musical Director
Journey into Fear (1975)
Jerome Moross
The Mountain Road (1960)
Five Finger Exercise (1962)Delbert MannJohn Williams
Fitzwilly (1967)
Heidi (1968)
CBS Playhouse (1968) Episode "Saturday Adoption"
Jane Eyre (1970)
Jerry Goldsmith
Playhouse 90 (1956-1960) - They collaborated on three episodes of the series.
A Gathering of Eagles (1963)
A Girl Named Sooner (1975)
Night Crossing (1982)
Fred Karlin
The Gift of Love: A Christmas Story (1983)
Love Leads The Way: A True Story (1984)
Allyn Ferguson
The Man Without a Country (1973) with Jack Elliott
All Quiet on the Western Front (1979)
The Last Days of Patton (1986)
April Morning (1988)
Ironclads (1991)
Against Her Will: An Incident in Baltimore (1992)Michael MannPieter Bourke and Lisa Gerrard
The Insider (1999)
Ali (2001)
Elliot Goldenthal
Heat (1995)
Public Enemies (2009)
Michel Rubini
Manhunter (1986)
Band of the Hand (1986)
Tangerine Dream
Thief (1981)
The Keep (1983)Richard MarquandJohn Barry
Until September (1984)
Jagged Edge (1985)
Hearts of Fire (1987)Edwin L. MarinFranz Waxman
A Christmas Carol (1938)
Florian (1940)
Dimitri Tiomkin
The Casino Murder Case (1935)
A Gentleman After Dark (1942)
Canadian Pacific (1949)
Herbert Stothart
Sequoia (1934)
Pursuit (1935)
Moonlight Murder (1936)Garry MarshallJohn Debney
The Princess Diaries (2001)
Raising Helen (2004)
The Princess Diaries 2: Royal Engagement (2004)
Georgia Rule (2007)
Valentine's Day (2010)
New Year's Eve (2011)
Mother's Day (2016)
James Newton Howard
Nothing in Common (1986) - Howard is credited as string conductor and music arranger.
Pretty Woman (1990)
Runaway Bride (1999)Penny MarshallHans Zimmer
A League of Their Own (1992)
Renaissance Man (1994)
The Preacher's Wife (1996)
Riding in Cars with Boys (2001)
Thomas Newman
Jumpin' Jack Flash (1986)
Cinderella Man (2005) – Produced byPaul MazurskyMaurice Jarre
Moon over Parador (1988)
Enemies, A Love Story (1989)
Bill Conti
Blume in Love (1973)
Harry and Tonto (1974)
Next Stop, Greenwich Village (1976)
An Unmarried Woman (1978)
Winchell (1998)
Coast to Coast (2003)Patricia MazuyJohn Cale
The King's Daughters (2000)
Sport de filles (2011)
Paul Sanchez est revenu! (2018)Craig McCrackenJames L. Venable
The Powerpuff Girls (1998–2005)
The Powerpuff Girls Movie (2002)
Foster's Home for Imaginary Friends (2004–2009) Martin McDonaghCarter Burwell
In Bruges (2008)
Seven Psychopaths (2012)
Three Billboards Outside Ebbing, Missouri (2017)
The Banshees of Inisherin (2022)Bernard McEveetyBuddy Baker
Napoleon and Samantha (1972)
The Bears and I (1974)
Donovan's Kid (1979)
Jerry Goldsmith
A Step Out of Line (1971)
One Little Indian (1973)Vincent McEveetyBuddy Baker
Walt Disney's Wonderful World of Color (1970) 
The Million Dollar Duck (1971)
Charley and the Angel (1973)
Superdad (1973)
Treasure of Matecumbe (1976)
The Apple Dumpling Gang Rides Again (1979)
Robert F. Brunner
The Biscuit Eater (1972)
The Castaway Cowboy (1974)
The Strongest Man in the World (1975)
Gus (1976)
Amy (1981)
Frank De Vol
Herbie Goes to Monte Carlo (1977)
Herbie Goes Bananas (1980)
Leonard Rosenman
The Road West (1966-1967) - They collaborated on a two-part episode.
This Savage Land (1967)McGChristophe Beck
We Are Marshall (2006)
This Means War (2012)
Bear McCreary
Rim of the World (2019)
The Babysitter: Killer Queen (2020)
Edward Shearmur
Charlie's Angels (2000)
Charlie's Angels: Full Throttle (2003)Michael McGowanAndrew Lockington
Saint Ralph (2004)
Left Coast (2008)
One Week (2008)Douglas McGrathDavid Lawrence
Company Man (2000)
Becoming Mike Nichols (2016)
Rachel Portman
Emma (1996)
Nicholas Nickleby (2002)
Infamous (2006)
His Way (2011)Tom McGrathHans Zimmer
Madagascar (2005)
Madagascar: Escape 2 Africa (2008)
Megamind (2010) with Lorne Balfe
Madagascar 3: Europe's Most Wanted (2012)
The Boss Baby (2017) with Steve Mazzaro
The Boss Baby: Family Business (2021) with Steve MazzaroAdam McKayJon Brion
Step Brothers (2008)
The Other Guys (2010)
Nicholas Britell
The Big Short (2015)
Vice (2018)
Don't Look Up (2021)
Alex Wurman
Anchorman: The Legend of Ron Burgundy (2004)
Talladega Nights: The Ballad of Ricky Bobby (2006)Andrew V. McLaglenFrank De Vol
McLintock! (1963)
The Ballad of Josie (1967)
Jerry Goldsmith
Have Gun - Will Travel (1957–1963) – They collaborated on one episode of the series.
Gunsmoke (1955–1975) - They collaborated on one episode of the series.
Bandolero! (1968)
The Last Hard Men (1976) – stock music only.
Leonard Rosenman
Hellfighters (1968)
The Last Hard Men (1976) Rejected Score
Laurence Rosenthal
 Hec Ramsey (1972–1974) – They collaborated on one episode.
 The Log of the Black Pearl (1975)
 On Wings of Eagles (1986)
Roy Budd
 The Wild Geese (1978)
 The Sea Wolves (1980)
Henryk Wars
 Gun the Man Down (1956)
 Man in the Vault (1956)
 Freckles (1960)
 The Little Shepherd of Kingdom Come (1961)
 Fools' Parade (1971)Christopher McQuarrieLorne Balfe
Mission: Impossible – Fallout (2018)
Mission: Impossible – Dead Reckoning Part One (2023)
Mission: Impossible – Dead Reckoning Part Two (2024)
Joe Kraemer
The Way of the Gun (2000)
Jack Reacher (2012)
Mission: Impossible – Rogue Nation (2015)Steve McQueenHans Zimmer
12 Years a Slave (2013)
Widows (2018)
Harry Escott
Shame (2011)
Uprising (2021)John McTiernanBill Conti
Nomads (1986)
The Thomas Crown Affair (1999)
Jerry Goldsmith
Medicine Man (1992)
The 13th Warrior (1999)
Michael Kamen
Die Hard (1988)
Last Action Hero (1993)
Die Hard with a Vengeance (1995)
Basil Poledouris
The Hunt for Red October (1990)
Amanda (1996) – Produced byTheodore MelfiBenjamin Wallfisch
Hidden Figures (2016)
The Starling (2021)Sam MendesThomas Newman
American Beauty (1999)
Road to Perdition (2002)
Jarhead (2005)
Revolutionary Road (2008)
Skyfall (2012)
Spectre (2015)
1917 (2019)Ramón MenéndezCraig Safan
Stand and Deliver (1988)
Money for Nothing (1993)
Gotta Kick It Up! (2002)Jiří MenzelJiří Šust
Pearls of the Deep (1966) - They contributed a segment. 
Closely Watched Trains (1966)
Capricious Summer (1968)
Larks on a String (1969)
Seclusion Near a Forest (1976)
Those Wonderful Movie Cranks (1979)
Cutting It Short (1981)
The Snowdrop Festival (1984)
My Sweet Little Village (1985)
Life and Extraordinary Adventures of Private Ivan Chonkin (1994)Kieth MerrillMerrill Jenson
Indian (1977) 
Three Warriors (1977)
Take Down (1979)
Windwalker (1980)
Harry's Wife (1981)
Alamo: The Price of Freedom (1988)
Polynesian Odyssey (1991)
Legacy (1993)
The Witness (1998)
The Testaments: Of One Fold and One Shepherd (2000)Nicholas MeyerJames Horner
Star Trek II: The Wrath of Khan (1982)
Faerie Tale Theatre (1982–1987) – They contributed an episode to the series.
Volunteers (1985)Russ MeyerIgo Kantor
Common Law Cabin (1967)
Good Morning and... Goodbye! (1967) 
Finders Keepers, Lovers Weepers! (1968)
Vixen! (1969)
William Loose
Finders Keepers, Lovers Weepers! (1968) - Stock Music
Cherry, Harry & Raquel! (1969)
Beyond the Valley of the Dolls (1970) - Additional Music
Black Snake (1973) 
Supervixens (1975)
Up! (1976)
Stu Phillips
Beyond the Valley of the Dolls (1970)
The Seven Minutes (1971)
Marlin Skiles
Wild Gals of the Naked West (1962)
Europe in the Raw (1963)Nancy MeyersHans Zimmer
Something's Gotta Give (2003)
The Holiday (2006)
It's Complicated (2009)
Alan Silvestri
Father of the Bride (1991) – Produced by
Father of the Bride Part II (1995) – Produced by
The Parent Trap (1998)
What Women Want (2000)
Something's Gotta Give (2003) Rejected Score Takashi MiikeKōji Endō
Rainy Dog (1997)
Full Metal Yakuza (1997)
The Bird People in China (1998)
Young Thugs: Nostalgia (1998)
Ley Lines (1999)
Audition (1999)
Dead or Alive (1999)
Man, Next Natural Girl: 100 Nights in Yokohama (1999)
The City of Lost Souls (2000)
Visitor Q (2001)
Agitator (2001)
The Happiness of the Katakuris (2001)
Dead or Alive: Final (2002)
Sabu (2002)
Graveyard of Honor (2002)
The Man in White (2003)
Gozu (2003)
One Missed Call (2003)
Zebraman (2004)
Three... Extremes (2004)
Izo (2004)
Demon Pond (2005)
The Great Yokai War (2005)
"Imprint" (2006)
Big Bang Love, Juvenile A (2006)
Sun Scarred (2006)
Sukiyaki Western Django (2007)
Like a Dragon (2007)
Detective Story (2007)
13 Assassins (2010)
Ace Attorney (2012)
Lesson of the Evil (2012)
Shield of Straw (2013)
The Mole Song: Undercover Agent Reiji (2013)
Over Your Dead Body (2014)
As the Gods Will (2014)
The Lion Standing in the Wind (2015)
Yakuza Apocalypse (2015)
Terra Formars (2016)
The Mole Song: Hong Kong Capriccio (2016)
Blade of the Immortal (2017)
JoJo's Bizarre Adventure: Diamond Is Unbreakable Chapter I (2017)
Laplace's Witch (2018)
First Love (2019)John MiliusBasil Poledouris
The Reversal of Richard Sun (1970)
Big Wednesday (1978)
Conan the Barbarian (1982)
Red Dawn (1984)
Farewell to the King (1989)
Flight of the Intruder (1991)Bennett MillerMychael Danna
Capote (2005)
Moneyball (2011)
Foxcatcher (2014) - Danna was credited for the reoccurring theme.George MillerBrian May
Mad Max (1979)
Mad Max 2 (1981)
John Powell
Happy Feet (2006)
Happy Feet Two (2011)
Junkie XL
Mad Max: Fury Road (2015)
Three Thousand Years of Longing (2022)
Furiosa (2024)
Jerry Goldsmith
Twilight Zone: The Movie (1983) Segment: "Nightmare at 20,000 Feet"
Babe (1995) (Rejected Score) - Produced byGeorge T. MillerBruce Rowland
The Man from Snowy River (1982)
All The Rivers Run (1983)
Anzacs (1985)
Cool Change (1986)
Bushfire Moon (1987)
Badlands 2005 (1988)
Gross Misconduct (1993)
Andre (1994)
The Great Elephant Escape (1995)
Zeus and Roxanne (1997)
Tidal Wave: No Escape (1997)
Journey to the Center of the Earth (1999)
Tribe (1999)Michael MillerDavid Shire
Always Remember I Love You (1990)
Heartbeat (1993)
Once in a Lifetime (1994)
Arthur B. Rubinstein
Roses Are for the Rich (1987)
Face Value (2001)
Peter Bernstein
Silent Rage (1982)
National Lampoon's Class Reunion (1982)Tim MillerJunkie XL
Deadpool (2016)
Terminator: Dark Fate (2019)Rob MinkoffAlan Silvestri
Stuart Little (1999)
Stuart Little 2 (2002)Steve MinerJerry Goldsmith
Warlock (1989)
Forever Young (1992)
Harry Manfredini
Friday the 13th Part 2 (1981)
Friday the 13th Part 3 (1982)
House (1985)
CBS Summer Playhouse (1987-1989) – They contributed an episode to the series. With Bruce Miller.
David Newman
My Father the Hero (1994)
Big Bully (1996)
John Ottman
Halloween H20: 20 Years Later (1998)
Lake Placid (1999)
Tom Scott
Soul Man (1986)
Maverick Square (1990)
W.G. Snuffy Walden
The Wonder Years (1988-1993)
Relativity (1996-1997) They contributed an episode to the series.Anthony MinghellaGabriel Yared
 The English Patient (1996)
 The Talented Mr. Ripley (1999)
 Cold Mountain (2003)
 Breaking and Entering (2006)
 The No. 1 Ladies' Detective Agency (2008–2009)Vincente MinnelliMiklós Rózsa
Madame Bovary (1949)
The Story of Three Loves (1953)
Lust for Life (1956)
The Seventh Sin (1957)
André Previn
Undercurrent (1946) – Previn is uncredited as music supervisor.
Kismet (1955)
Designing Women (1957)
Gigi (1958)
Bells Are Ringing (1960)
The Four Horsemen of the Apocalypse (1962)
Goodbye Charlie (1964)
Adolph Deutsch
Father of the Bride (1950)
The Band Wagon (1953)
The Long, Long Trailer (1954)
Tea and Sympathy (1956)
David Raksin
I Dood It (1943) – Raskin is an uncredited composer.
The Bad and the Beautiful (1952)
Two Weeks in Another Town (1962)
George Stoll
Cabin in the Sky (1943) – Musical Director
I Dood It (1943) - Musical Director
Father's Little Dividend (1951) - Conductor
The Courtship of Eddie's Father (1963)David Robert MitchellDisasterpeace
It Follows (2014)
Under the Silver Lake (2018)Mike MitchellMark Mothersbaugh
Alvin and the Chipmunks: Chipwrecked (2011)
The Lego Movie 2: The Second Part (2019)Gorō Miyazaki 
Satoshi Takebe
From Up on Poppy Hill (2011)
Ronja, the Robber's Daughter (2014)
Earwig and the Witch (2020)Hayao MiyazakiJoe Hisaishi
Nausicaä of the Valley of the Wind (1984)
Castle in the Sky (1986)
My Neighbor Totoro (1988)
Kiki's Delivery Service (1989)
Porco Rosso (1992)
Princess Mononoke (1997)
Spirited Away (2001)
Mei and the kittenbus (2002) - Short film
Imaginary Flying Machines (2002) - Short film
Howl's Moving Castle (2004)
Ponyo (2008)
Mr. Dough and the Egg Princess (2010) - Short film
The Wind Rises (2013)
How Do You Live? (2023)Kenji MizoguchiFumio Hayasaka
Portrait of Madame Yuki (1950)
Miss Oyu (1951)
The Lady of Musashino (1951)
Ugetsu (1953)
The Crucified Lovers (1954)
Sansho the Bailiff (1954)
Princess Yang Kwei-Fei (1955)
Tales of the Taira Clan (1955)Giuliano MontaldoEnnio Morricone
Ad ogni costo (1967)
Gli intoccabili (1969)
Sacco and Vanzetti (1971)
Giordano Bruno (1973)
L'Agnese va a morire (1976)
Il giocattolo (1979)
Marco Polo (1982) - miniserie TV
Il giorno prima (1987)
Gli occhiali d'oro (1987)
Tempo di uccidere (1991)
I Demoni di San Pietroburgo (2008)Tomm MooreBruno Coulais
The Secret of Kells (2009)
Song of the Sea (2014)
Wolfwalkers (2020)Rich MooreHenry Jackman
Wreck-It Ralph (2012)
Ralph Breaks the Internet (2018)Glen MorganShirley Walker
Space: Above and Beyond (1995–1996) – Executive Producer
The Notorious 7 (1997) – Produced by
Final Destination (2000) – Produced by
Willard (2003)
Final Destination 3 (2006) – Produced by
Black Christmas (2006)Jonathan MostowRichard Marvin
Flight of Black Angel (1991)
Breakdown (1997) – Marvin composed additional music for the film.
U-571 (2000)
Them (2007)
Surrogates (2009)Shuhei MoritaReiji Kitazato
Kakurenbo (2004)
Coicent (2010)
Short Peace (2013) (They collaborate on the Possessions segment)
Super Mobile Block KASHIWA-NO-HA (2015)Robert MulliganElmer Bernstein
Fear Strikes Out (1957)
The Rat Race (1960)
To Kill a Mockingbird (1962)
Love with the Proper Stranger (1963)
Baby the Rain Must Fall (1965)
Bloodbrothers (1978)
Jerry Goldsmith
Playhouse 90 (1956-1960) – They collaborate on one episode.
The Spiral Road (1962)
The Other (1972)
Dave Grusin
The Pursuit of Happines (1971)
The Nickel Ride (1975)
Clara's Heart (1988)
Fred Karlin
Up the Down Staircase (1967)
The Stalking Moon (1968)Geoff Murphy 
John Charles
Goodbye Pork Pie (1981)
Utu (1983) 
The Quiet Earth (1985)
Spooked (2004) Andy MuschiettiBenjamin Wallfisch
It (2017)
It Chapter Two (2019)
The Flash (2023)

 N Mike NawrockiKurt Heinecke
Jonah: A VeggieTales Movie (2002)
The Pirates Who Don't Do Anything: A VeggieTales Movie (2008)Hal NeedhamBill Justis
Smokey and the Bandit (1977) with Jerry Reed.
Hooper (1978)
The Villain (1979)
Snuff Garrett
Smokey and the Bandit II (1980) - Garrett is a music supervisor for the film.
The Cannonball Run (1981) - Garrett is a music supervisor for the film.
Cannonball Run II (1984) - Garrett is a music supervisor for the film.
Hard Time: Hostage Hotel (1999)
Al Capps
Smokey and the Bandit II (1980) - Conductor.
The Cannonball Run (1981)
Stroker Ace (1983)
Cannonball Run II (1984)Jean NegulescoFranz Waxman
Humoresque (1946)
Phone Call from a Stranger (1952)
Lure of the Wilderness (1952)
Count Your Blessings (1959)
Max Steiner
The Conspirators (1944)
Deep Valley (1947)
Johnny Belinda (1948)
Adolph Deutsch
Singapore Woman (1941)
The Mask of Dimitrios (1944)
Three Strangers (1946)
Nobody Lives Forever (1946)
Cyril J. Mockridge
Road House (1948)
How to Marry a Millionaire (1953) - Incidental Music
Woman's World (1954)
Hugo Friedhofer
Spanish Fiesta (1942) - Orchestral Arrangements.
Three Came Home (1950)
Lydia Bailey (1952)
The Rains of Ranchipur (1955)
Boy on a Dolphin (1957)
Alfred Newman
Road House (1948) - Newman is an uncredited composer.
O. Henry's Full House (1952) - They collaborated on a segment.
How to Marry a Millionaire (1953)Jennifer Yuh NelsonHans Zimmer
Kung Fu Panda 2 (2011)
Kung Fu Panda 3 (2016)Ralph NelsonLalo Schifrin
Once a Thief (1965)
The Wrath of God (1972)
Jerry Goldsmith
Studio One (1948–1958) - They collaborated on one episode of the series.
General Electric Theater (1953–1962) - They collaborated on one episode of the series.
Lilies of the Field (1963)
Fate Is the Hunter (1964)
Roy Budd
Soldier Blue (1970)
Flight of the Doves (1971)Mike NewellRichard Rodney Bennett
Enchanted April (1992)
Four Weddings and a Funeral (1994)
Patrick Doyle
Into the West (1992)
Donnie Brasco (1997)
Harry Potter and the Goblet of Fire (2005)
Richard Hartley
Bad Blood (1982)
Dance with a Stranger (1985)
The Good Father (1985)
Soursweet (1988)
An Awfully Big Adventure (1995)
Great Expectations (2012)Joseph P. NewmanEmil Newman
Jungle Patrol (1948)
Death in Small Doses (1957)Paul NewmanHenry Mancini
Sometimes a Great Notion (1971)
The Shadow Box (1980)
Harry & Son (1984)
The Glass Menagerie (1987)Andrew NiccolChristophe Beck
Good Kill (2014)
Anon (2018)Jeff NicholsDavid Wingo
Take Shelter (2011)
Mud (2012)
Midnight Special (2016)
Loving (2016)Mike NicholsGeorges Delerue
The Day of the Dolphin (1973)
Silkwood (1983)
Biloxi Blues (1988)
Regarding Henry (1991) Rejected Score
Carly Simon
Heartburn (1986)
Working Girl (1988)
Postcards from the Edge (1990)Leonard NimoyLeonard Rosenman
Star Trek IV: The Voyage Home (1986)
Body Wars (1989)Marcus NispelSteve Jablonsky
The Texas Chainsaw Massacre (2003)
Friday the 13th (2009)Christopher NolanLudwig Göransson
Tenet (2020)
Oppenheimer (2023)
James Newton Howard
Batman Begins (2005) With Hans Zimmer.
The Dark Knight (2008) With Hans Zimmer.
David Julyan
Following (1998)
Memento (2000)
Insomnia (2002)
The Prestige (2006)
Hans Zimmer
Batman Begins (2005) With James Newton Howard.
The Dark Knight (2008) With James Newton Howard.
Inception (2010)
The Dark Knight Rises (2012)
Man of Steel (2013) - Produced by
Interstellar (2014)
Dunkirk (2017)Jonathan NolanRamin Djawadi
Person of Interest (2011–2016)
Westworld (2016)Phillip NoyceCraig Armstrong
The Bone Collector (1999)
The Quiet American (2002)
James Horner
Patriot Games (1992)
Clear and Present Danger (1994)
iZLER
Revenge (2011–2012)
Americana (2012)
Philip Miller
Catch a Fire (2006)
Mary and Martha (2013)
Roots (2016) (Episode 1)
William Motzing
Newsfront (1978)
Echoes of Paradise (1989)
Graeme Revell
Dead Calm (1989)
The Saint (1997)Victor NuñezCharles Engstrom
A Flash of Green (1984)
Ruby in Paradise (1993)
Ulee's Gold (1997)
Coastlines (2002)Joe NussbaumDeborah Lurie
George Lucas in Love (1999)
Sleepover (2004)
Sydney White (2007)
Prom (2011)

 O Gavin O'ConnorMark Isham
Miracle (2004)
Pride and Glory (2008)
Warrior (2011)
The Accountant (2016)Steve OedekerkJohn Debney
Jimmy Neutron: Boy Genius (2001) — Produced by
Bruce Almighty (2003) — Executive Producer
Barnyard (2006)
Robert Folk
Ace Ventura: When Nature Calls (1995)
Nothing to Lose (1997)
Thumb Wars: The Phantom Cuticle (1999)
Kung Pow! Enter the Fist (2002)Takao OkawaraAkira Ifukube
Godzilla vs Mothra (1992)
Godzilla vs Mechagodzilla II (1993)
Godzilla vs Destoroyah (1995)Laurence OlivierWilliam Walton
Henry V (1944)
Hamlet (1948)
Richard III (1955)
Three Sisters (1970)Mark OsborneHans Zimmer
Kung Fu Panda (2008) With John Powell
The Little Prince (2015) With Richard Harvey Mamoru OshiiKenji Kawai
Twilight Q (1987)
The Red Spectacles (1987)
Patlabor (1988)
Patlabor: The Movie (1989)
StrayDog: Kerberos Panzer Cops (1991)
Talking Head (1992)
Patlabor 2: The Movie (1993)
Ghost in the Shell (1995)
Avalon (2001)	
Ghost in the Shell 2: Innocence (2004)
The Sky Crawlers (2008)
Assault Girls (2009)
The Last Druid: Garm Wars (2015)Frank OzMiles Goodman
 The Dark Crystal (1982) Jim Henson co-directed this film.
 Little Shop of Horrors (1986)
 Dirty Rotten Scoundrels (1988)
 What About Bob? (1991)
 Housesitter (1992)Yasujirō OzuSenji Itō
The Only Son (1936)
What Did the Lady Forget? (1937)
Brothers and Sisters of the Toda Family (1941)
A Hen in the Wind (1948)
Late Spring (1949)
Early Summer (1951)
Takanobu Saitô
Tokyo Story (1953)
Early Spring (1956)
Tokyo Twilight (1957)
Equinox Flower (1958)
Floating Weeds (1959)
Late Autumn (1960)
An Autumn Afternoon (1962)

 P José PadilhaPedro Bromfman
Elite Squad (2007)
Elite Squad: The Enemy Within (2010)
RoboCop (2014)
Narcos (2015)Alan J. PakulaMarvin Hamlisch
Starting Over (1979)
Sophie's Choice (1982)
James Horner
The Pelican Brief (1993)
The Devil's Own (1997)
Michael Small
Klute (1971)
Love and Pain and the Whole Damn Thing (1973)
The Parallax View (1974)
Comes A Horseman (1978)
Rollover (1981)
Dream Lover (1986)
Orphans (1987)
See You In The Morning (1989)
Consenting Adults (1992)
Fred Karlin
Up the Down Staircase (1967) - Produced by
The Stalking Moon (1968) - Produced by
The Sterile Cuckoo (1969)Nick ParkHarry Gregson-Williams
Chicken Run (2000)
Early Man (2018)
Julian Nott
A Grand Day Out (1989)
The Wrong Trousers (1993)
A Close Shave (1995)
Wallace and Gromit's Cracking Contraptions (2002) - Produced by
Wallace & Gromit: The Curse of the Were-Rabbit (2005)
A Matter of Loaf and Death (2008)
Wallace and Gromit's World of Invention (2010) - Executive ProducerAlan ParkerTrevor Jones
Angel Heart (1987)
Mississippi Burning (1988)Oliver ParkerCharlie Mole
Othello (1995)
An Ideal Husband (1999)
The Importance of Being Earnest (2002)
I Really Hate My Job (2007)
St Trinian's (2007)
Dorian Gray (2009)
St Trinian's 2: The Legend of Fritton's Gold (2009)
Dad's Army (2016)
Swimming with Men (2018)Robert ParrishGeorge Duning
The Mob (1951)
Assignment – Paris! (1952)
Emil Newman
Cry Danger (1951)
The San Francisco Story (1952)John PasquinMichael Convertino
The Santa Clause (1994)
Jungle 2 Jungle (1997)Pier Paolo PasoliniEnnio Morricone
Uccellacci e uccellini (1966)
The Witches - Segment "The Earth Seen from the Moon"
Teorema (1968)
Il Decameron (1971)
I racconti di Canterbury (1972)
Il fiore delle Mille e una Notte (1974)
Salò o le 120 giornate di Sodoma (1975)Alexander PayneRolfe Kent
Citizen Ruth (1996)
Election (1999)
About Schmidt (2002)
Sideways (2004)
Downsizing (2017)Richard PearceCliff Eidelman
Dead Man Out (1989)
The Final Days (1989)
Leap of Faith (1992)
Witness Protection (1999)
Charles Gross
Siege (1978)
No Other Love (1979)
Heartland (1979)
Sessions (1983)
Country (1984)
A Family Thing (1996)Kris PearnMark Mothersbaugh 
Cloudy with a Chance of Meatballs 2 (2013)
The Willoughbys (2020)Sam PeckinpahJerry Fielding
Noon Wine (1966)
The Wild Bunch (1969)
Straw Dogs (1971)
Junior Bonner (1972)
The Getaway (1972) Rejected Score
Bring Me the Head of Alfredo Garcia (1974)
The Killer Elite (1975)Jordan PeeleMichael Abels
Get Out (2017)
Us (2019)
Nope (2022)Larry PeerceBasil Poledouris
Prison for Children (1987)
Wired (1989)
Charles Fox
The Incident (1967)
Goodbye, Columbus (1969)
A Separate Peace (1972)
The Other Side of the Mountain (1975)
Two-Minute Warning (1976)
Why Would I Lie? (1980)
Love Child (1982)
Billy Goldenberg
A Burning Passion: The Margaret Mitchell Story (1994)
An Element of Truth (1995)
Christmas Every Day (1996)
Lalo Schifrin
The Neon Empire (1989)
A Woman Named Jackie (1991)
Gerald Fried
One Potato, Two Potato (1964)
The Bell Jar (1979)
Joseph Conlan
Love–Struck (1997)
Holy Joe (1999)
Second Honeymoon (2001)Sean PennHans Zimmer
The Pledge (2001)
The Last Face (2016)
Jack Nitzsche
The Indian Runner (1991)
The Crossing Guard (1995)Vadim PerelmanJames Horner
House of Sand and Fog (2003)
The Life Before Her Eyes (2007)Oz PerkinsElvis Perkins
The Blackcoat's Daughter (2015)
I Am the Pretty Thing That Lives in the House (2016)Tyler PerryChristopher Lennertz
Boo 2! A Madea Halloween (2017)
Acrimony (2018)
Elvin Ross
Madea's Family Reunion (2006)
Boo! A Madea Halloween (2016)
Philip White
Boo 2! A Madea Halloween (2017)
Nobody's Fool (2018)
A Madea Family Funeral (2019)
A Madea Homecoming (2022)
Christopher Young
A Madea Christmas (2013)
The Single Moms Club (2014)
Aaron Zigman
Why Did I Get Married? (2007)
Meet the Browns (2008)
The Family That Preys (2008)
Madea Goes to Jail (2009)
I Can Do Bad All By Myself (2009)
Why Did I Get Married Too? (2010)
For Colored Girls (2010)
Madea's Big Happy Family (2011)
Good Deeds (2012)
Madea's Witness Protection (2012)
Temptation: Confessions of a Marriage Counselor (2013)
A Jazzman's Blues (2022)Wolfgang PetersenKlaus Doldinger
Einer von uns beiden (1974)
Die Konsequenz (1977)
Planübung (1977)
Black and White Like Day and Night (1978)
Das Boot (1981)
The NeverEnding Story (1984) With Giorgio Moroder.
James Horner
Bicentennial Man (1999) - Produced by
The Perfect Storm (2000)
Troy (2004)Elio PetriEnnio Morricone
A Quiet Place in the Country (1968)
Investigation of a Citizen Above Suspicion (1970)
The Working Class Goes to Heaven (1971)
Property Is No Longer a Theft (1973)
Todo modo (1976)
Good News (1979)Donald PetrieJohn Debney
My Favorite Martian (1999)
Welcome to Mooseport (2004)
David Newman
How to Lose a Guy in 10 Days (2003)
My Life in Ruins (2009)
Alan Silvestri
Grumpy Old Men (1993)
Richie Rich (1994)Daniel PetrieJohn Barry
Eleanor and Franklin (1976)
Eleanor and Franklin: The White House Years (1977)
The Betsy (1978)
Leonard Rosenman
The Bramble Briar (1960)
Sybil (1976)
Laurence Rosenthal
A Raisin in the Sun (1961)
My Name Is Bill W. (1989)
Mark Twain and Me (1991)
Inherit the Wind (1999)
Wild Iris (2001)Brad PeytonAndrew Lockington
Journey 2: The Mysterious Island (2012)
San Andreas (2015)
Incarnate (2016)
Rampage (2018)Renji PhilipJosh Mancell
Stanley (2008)
Milkshake (2008)Todd PhillipsChristophe Beck
School for Scoundrels (2006)
The Hangover (2009)
Due Date (2010)
The Hangover Part II (2011)
The Hangover Part III (2013)
Theodore Shapiro
Old School (2003)
Starsky & Hutch (2004)Charles B. PierceJaime Mendoza-Nava
The Legend of Boggy Creek (1972)
Bootleggers (1974)
The Winds of Autumn (1976)
The Town That Dreaded Sundown (1976)
Grayeagle (1977)
The Norseman (1978)
The Evictors (1979)Claude PinoteauGeorges Delerue
The Slap (1974)
The Big Operator (1976)Angelina Jolie PittGabriel Yared
In the Land of Blood and Honey (2011)
By the Sea (2015)Sidney PoitierTom Scott
Uptown Saturday Night (1974)
Stir Crazy (1980)
Hanky Panky (1982)
Fast Forward (1985)Roman PolanskiAlexandre Desplat
The Ghost Writer (2010)
Carnage (2011)
Venus in Fur (2013)
Based on a True Story (2017)
An Officer and a Spy (2019)
The Palace (2023)
Wojciech Kilar
Death and the Maiden (1994)
The Ninth Gate (1999)
The Pianist (2002)
Krzysztof Komeda
Two Men and a Wardrobe (1958)
When Angels Fall (1959)
The Fat and the Lean (1961)
Mammals (1961)
Knife in the Water (1962)
Les Plus Belles Escroqueries du Monde (1964) - They contributed a segment to the film.
Cul-de-sac (1966)
The Fearless Vampire Killers (1967)
Rosemary's Baby (1968)
Philippe Sarde
The Tenant (1976)
Tess (1979)
Pirates (1986)Sydney PollackDave Grusin
The Yakuza (1974)
Three Days of the Condor (1975)
Bobby Deerfield (1977)
The Electric Horseman (1979)
Absence of Malice (1981)
Tootsie (1982)
The Fabulous Baker Boys (1989) – Executive Producer
Havana (1990)
The Firm (1993)
Random Hearts (1999)
Recount (2008) – Executive Producer
John Williams
Bob Hope Presents the Chrysler Theatre (1963-1967) - They collaborated on one of the episodes.
Kraft Suspense Theatre (1963-1965) - They collaborated on two episodes in the series.
Presumed Innocent (1990) - Produced by
Sabrina (1995)
James Newton Howard
The Interpreter (2005)
Michael Clayton (2007) – Produced byJames PonsoldtDanny Elfman
The End of the Tour (2015)
The Circle (2017)Ted PostLeonard Rosenman
Law of the Plainsman (1959-1960) - They collaborated on one of the episodes of the series.
Combat! (1962-1967) - They collaborated on several episodes of the series.
Beneath the Planet of the Apes (1970)
The Bravos (1972)Michael Powell and Emeric Pressburger

Brian Easdale
Black Narcissus (1947)
The Red Shoes (1948)
Hour of Glory (1949)
Gone to Earth (1950)
The Fighting Pimpernel (1950)
The Wild Heart (1952)
Pursuit of the Graf Spee (1956)
Peeping Tom (1960)
The Queen's Guards (1961)
Miklós Rózsa
The Spy in Black (1939)
The Thief of Bagdad (1940)Otto PremingerAlfred Newman
A Royal Scandal (1945)
Centennial Summer (1946)
Whirlpool (1949) - Newman composed the trailer theme.
David Raksin
Laura (1944)
Fallen Angel (1945)
Forever Amber (1947)
Daisy Kenyon (1947)
Whirlpool (1949) 
Dimitri Tiomkin
Angel Face (1953)
The Court-Martial of Billy Mitchell (1955)
Cyril J. Mockridge
 Danger - Love at Work (1937) - Mockridge is an uncredited composer.
In the Meantime, Darling (1944)
Where the Sidewalk Ends (1950)
River of No Return (1954)Michael PressmanCraig Safan
The Great Dynamite Chase (1976)
The Bad News Bears in Breaking Training (1977)
The Imposter (1984)
Shootdown (1988)
The Revenge of Al Capone (1989)
Miracle Child (1993)
A Season for Miracles (1999)
Lalo Schifrin
Boulevard Nights (1979)
Doctor Detroit (1983)Alex ProyasMarco Beltrami
I, Robot (2004)
Knowing (2009)
Gods of Egypt (2016)
Trevor Jones
Dark City (1998)
I, Robot (2004) Rejected ScoreAlbert PyunAnthony Riparetti
Alien from L.A. (1988)
Cyborg (1989) - Directors Cut 
Deceit (1989)
Kickboxer 2: The Road Back (1991)
Bloodmatch (1991)
Dollman (1991)
Brainsmasher... A Love Story (1993)
Knights (1993)
Arcade (1993) - Alternate score
Kickboxer 4: The Aggressor (1994)
Spitfire (1995)
Heatspeeker (1995)
Nemesis 2: Nebula (1995)
Nemesis 3: Time Lapse (1996)
Omega Doom (1996)
Nemesis 4: Death Angel (1996)
Blast (1997)
Mean Guns (1997)
Crazy Six (1997)
Postmortem (1998)
Sorcerers (1998)
Urban Menace (1999) 
Corrupt (1999)
The Wrecking Crew (2000)
Invasion (2005)
Cool Air (2006)
Left for Dead (2007)
Road to Hell (2008)
Bulletface (2010)
Tales of an Ancient Empire (2010)
The Interrogation of Cheryl Cooper (2014) 
Interstellar Civil War: Shadows of the Empire (2017)
Cyborg Nemesis: The Dark Rift (2018)
Bad Ass Angels (2018)
Algiers (2018)

 R Bob RafelsonMichael Small
The Postman Always Rings Twice (1981)
Black Widow (1987) 
Mountains of the Moon (1990)
Poodle Springs (1998)Sam RaimiDanny Elfman
Darkman (1990)
Army of Darkness (1992) - Elfman wrote the theme song
A Simple Plan (1998)
Spider-Man (2002)
Spider-Man 2 (2004)
Oz: The Great and Powerful (2013)
Doctor Strange in the Multiverse of Madness (2022)
65 (2023) - Produced by
Joseph LoDuca
The Evil Dead (1981)
Crimewave (1985) - Music Consultant / Rejected Score 
Evil Dead II (1987)
Army of Darkness (1992)
M.A.N.T.I.S. (1994–1995) - Executive Producer
Hercules: The Legendary Journeys (1994–1999) - Executive Producer
Xena: Warrior Princess (1995-2001) - Executive Producer
American Gothic (1995–1996) - Executive Producer
Hercules and Xena – The Animated Movie: The Battle for Mount Olympus (1998) - Produced by
Young Hercules (1998–1999) - Executive Producer
Jack of All Trades (2000) - Executive Producer
Cleopatra 2525 (2000–2001) – Executive Producer
Xena: Warrior Princess – A Friend in Need (2002) - Produced by
Spider-Man 2 (2004) – additional music
Boogeyman (2005) - Produced by
The Messengers (2007) - Produced by
Legend of the Seeker (2008–2010) – Executive Producer
Spartacus: Gods of the Arena (2011) – Executive Producer
Spartacus (2010–2013)  – Executive Producer
Ash vs. Evil Dead (2015) Episode "El jefe"
Christopher Young
The Gift (2000)
Spider-Man 2 (2004) - Young composed additional music for the film.
The Grudge (2004) - Produced by
The Grudge 2 (2006) - Produced by
Spider-Man 3 (2007)
Drag Me to Hell (2009)
50 States of Fright (2020) Episode "The Golden Arm"S. S. RajamouliM. M. Keeravani
Student No. 1 (2001)
Simhadri (2003)
Challenge (2004)
Chatrapathi (2005)
Vikramarkudu (2006)
Thief of Yama (2007)
Magadheera (2009)
Maryada Ramanna (2010)
Eega (2012)
Baahubali: The Beginning (2015)
Baahubali 2: The Conclusion (2017)
RRR (2022)Harold RamisGeorge Fenton
Groundhog Day (1993)
Multiplicity (1996)Lynne RamsayJonny Greenwood
We Need to Talk About Kevin (2011)
You Were Never Really Here (2017)Mani RatnamA. R. Rahman
Roja (1992)
Thiruda Thiruda (1993)
Bombay (1995)
Iruvar (1997)
Dil Se.. (1998)
Alaipayuthey (2000)
Kannathil Muthamittal (2002)
Aayutha Ezhuthu (2004)
Yuva (2004)
Guru (2007)
Raavan (2010)
Raavanan (2010)
Kadal (2013)
O Kadhal Kanmani (2015) 
Kaatru Veliyidai (2017)Brett RatnerDanny Elfman
The Family Man (2000)
Red Dragon (2002)
Lalo Schifrin
Money Talks (1997)
Rush Hour (1998)
Rush Hour 2 (2001)
After the Sunset (2004)
Rush Hour 3 (2007)
Christophe Beck
Tower Heist (2011)
Movie 43 (2013) Segment: "Happy Birthday"
30 for 30: Soccer Stories (2014) - They contributed an episode of the series.Fred Olen RayChuck Cirino
Alienator (1987)
Mob Boss (1990)
Inner Sanctum (1991)
Evil Toons (1992)
Dinosaur Island (1994) Jim Wynorski served as co-director.
Possessed by the Night (1994)Robert RedfordMark Isham
A River Runs Through It (1992)
Quiz Show (1994)
Lions for Lambs (2007)
The Conspirator (2010)Peyton ReedChristophe Beck
Bring It On (2000)
Ant-Man (2015)
Ant-Man and the Wasp (2018)
Ant-Man and the Wasp: Quantumania (2023)Dee ReesTamar-kali
Mudbound (2017)
The Last Thing He Wanted (2020)Jerry ReesDavid Newman
The Brave Little Toaster (1987)
The Marrying Man (1991)
Michael & Mickey (1991)Matt ReevesMichael Giacchino
Cloverfield (2008)
Let Me In (2010)
Dawn of the Planet of the Apes (2014)
War for the Planet of the Apes (2017)
The Batman (2022)Nicolas Winding RefnCliff Martinez
Drive (2011)
Only God Forgives (2013) 
The Neon Demon (2016)
Too Old To Die Young (2018)
Peter Peter
Pusher (1996)
Bleeder (1999)
Pusher II (2004)
Pusher 3 (2005)
Valhalla Rising (2009)Godfrey ReggioPhilip Glass
Koyaanisqatsi (1982)
Powaqqatsi (1988)
Anima Mundi (1992)
Naqoyqatsi (2002)
Visitors (2013)Carl ReinerJack Elliott
The Comic (1969)
Where's Poppa? (1970) 
The New Dick Van Dyke Show (1971 to 1974)
Oh God! (1977)
The Jerk (1979)
Sibling Rivalry (1990)
Patrick Williams
The One and Only (1978)
All of Me (1984)
That Old Feeling (1997)Rob ReinerMarc Shaiman
When Harry Met Sally... (1989)
Misery (1990)
A Few Good Men (1992)
North (1994)
The American President (1995)
Ghosts of Mississippi (1996)
The Story of Us (1999)
Alex & Emma (2003)
Rumor Has It (2005)
The Bucket List (2007)
Flipped (2010)
The Magic of Belle Isle (2012)
And So It Goes (2014)
LBJ (2016)Wolfgang ReithermanGeorge Bruns
Goliath II (1960)
101 Dalmatians (1961)
The Sword in the Stone (1963)
The Jungle Book (1967)
The Aristocats (1970)
Robin Hood (1973)
 Sherman Brothers
The Sword in the Stone (1963)
The Jungle Book (1967)
The Aristocats (1970)
The Many Adventures of Winnie the Pooh (1977)Ivan ReitmanElmer Bernstein
Animal House (1978) - Produced by
Meatballs (1979)
Stripes (1981)
Heavy Metal (1981) - Produced by
Spacehunter: Adventures in the Forbidden Zone (1983) – Executive Producer
Ghostbusters (1984)
Legal Eagles (1986)
Randy Edelman
Twins (1988)
Ghostbusters II (1989)
Kindergarten Cop (1990)
Six Days, Seven Nights (1998)
 Don Riley
Foxy Lady (1971) 
Cannibal Girls (1973)
John Debney
No Strings Attached (2011)
Draft Day (2014)
James Newton Howard
Dave (1993)
Junior (1994)
Space Jam (1996) - Produced by
Father's Day (1997)Jason ReitmanRolfe Kent
Thank You for Smoking (2005)
Up in the Air (2009)
Young Adult (2011)
Labor Day (2013)
Rob Simonsen
Tully (2018)
The Front Runner (2018)
Ghostbusters: Afterlife (2021)Chris RenaudHeitor Pereira
Despicable Me (2010)
Despicable Me 2 (2013)
Minions (2015) - Executive Producer
Despicable Me 3 (2017) - Executive Producer
Minions: The Rise of Gru (2022) - Produced by
Alexandre Desplat
The Secret Life of Pets (2016)
The Secret Life of Pets 2 (2019)Jean RenoirJoseph Kosma
The Crime of Monsieur Lange (1936)
Partie de campagne (1936) 
La Grande Illusion (1937)
La Marseillaise (1938)
La Bête Humaine (1938)
The Rules of the Game (1939) .
Elena and Her Men (1956)
Experiment in Evil (1959)
Picnic on the Grass (1959)
The Elusive Corporal (1962)
Il fiore e la violenza (1962) - Segment "La Scampagnata
The Little Theatre of Jean Renoir (1970)David Lowell RichMaurice Jarre
Enola Gay: The Men, the Mission, the Atomic Bomb (1980)
Chu Chu and the Philly Flash (1981) with Pete Rugolo.
The Sky's No Limit (1984)
Lalo Schifrin
See How They Run (1964)
Eye of the Cat (1969)
The Mask of Sheba (1970)
The Concorde... Airport '79 (1979)
Henry Mancini
Peter Gunn (1958–1961) – They collaborated on two episode.
A Family Upside Down (1978)Tony RichardsonJohn Addison
Look Back in Anger (1959) - Music Supervisor 
The Entertainer (1960)
A Taste of Honey (1961)
The Loneliness of the Long Distance Runner (1962)
Tom Jones (1963)
The Loved One (1965)
The Charge of the Light Brigade (1968)
Dead Cert (1974)
Joseph Andrews (1977)
A Death in Canaan (1978) - Music Supervisor 
Beryl Markham: A Shadow on the Sun (1988)
The Phantom of the Opera (1990)William RichertMaurice Jarre
Winter Kills (1979)
The American Success Company (1980)Guy RitchieJohn Murphy
Lock, Stock and Two Smoking Barrels (1998)
Snatch (2000)
Daniel Pemberton
The Man from U.N.C.L.E. (2015)
King Arthur: Legend of the Sword (2017)
Hans Zimmer
Sherlock Holmes (2009)
Sherlock Holmes: A Game of Shadows (2011)Michael RitchieMichel Colombier
The Golden Child (1986)
The Couch Trip (1988)
James Newton Howard
Wildcats (1986)
Diggstown (1992)
Jerry Fielding
The Bad News Bears (1976)
Semi-Tough (1977)Martin RittHenry Mancini
The Molly Maguires (1970)
Back Roads (1981)
Alex North
The Long, Hot Summer (1958)
The Sound and the Fury (1959)
The Outrage (1964)
Sounder (1972) Rejected Score
Leonard Rosenman
Edge of the City (1957)
Cross Creek (1983)
John Williams
Pete 'n' Tillie (1972)
Conrack (1974)
Stanley & Iris (1990)
Elmer Bernstein
Hud (1963)
Casey's Shadow (1978) Rejected Score Jay RoachGeorge S. Clinton
Austin Powers: International Man of Mystery (1997)
Austin Powers: The Spy Who Shagged Me (1999)
Austin Powers in Goldmember (2002)
Randy Newman
Meet the Parents (2000) 
Meet the Fockers (2004)
Theodore Shapiro
Dinner for Schmucks (2010)
Game Change (2012)
The Campaign (2012)
Trumbo (2015)
Bombshell (2019)Brian RobbinsJohn Debney
Dreamer (2005) - Produced by
Meet Dave (2008)
A Thousand Words (2012)
Supah Ninjas (2011-2013) - Theme Music Only.Matthew RobbinsCraig Safan
Corvette Summer (1978)
The Legend of Billie Jean (1985)
Amazing Stories (1985) Episode "The Main Attraction"Yves RobertVladimir Cosma
Very Happy Alexander (1968)
Clerambard (1969)
The Tall Blond Man with One Black Shoe (1972)
Hail the Artist (1973)
The Return of the Tall Blond Man with One Black Shoe (1974)
Pardon Mon Affaire (1976)
Pardon Mon Affaire, Too! (1977)
Courage fuyons (1979) 
The Twin (1984)
My Father's Glory (1990)
My Mother's Castle (1990) 
Le Bal des casse-pieds (1992)
Montparnasse-Pondichéry (1994) 
Georges Van Parys
Les hommes ne pensent qu'à ça (1954)
Signé Arsène Lupin (1959) 
 Phil Alden RobinsonJames Horner
Field of Dreams (1989)
Sneakers (1992)
Freedom Song (2000)Mark RobsonJohn Williams
Valley of the Dolls (1967)
Daddy's Gone A-Hunting (1969)
Earthquake (1974)
Leigh Harline
Isle of the Dead (1945)
I Want You (1951)
Jerry Goldsmith
The Prize (1963)
Von Ryan's Express (1965)
Franz Waxman
Peyton Place (1957)
Lost Command (1966)
Dimitri Tiomkin
Champion (1949)
Home of the Brave (1949)
Return to Paradise (1953)
Hugo Friedhofer
Edge of Doom (1950)
The Harder They Fall (1956)
Roy Webb
The Seventh Victim (1943)
The Ghost Ship (1943)
Bedlam (1946)
Roughshod (1949)
Malcolm Arnold
A Prize of Gold (1955)
The Inn of the Sixth Happiness (1958)
Nine Hours to Rama (1963)Chris RockMarcus Miller
Head of State (2003)
Everybody Hates Chris (2005-2009)
I Think I Love My Wife (2007)
Good Hair (2009)Robert RodriguezJohn Debney
Spy Kids (2001)
Spy Kids 2: The Island of Lost Dreams (2002)
Sin City (2005)
The Adventures of Sharkboy and Lavagirl in 3-D (2005)
Predators (2010)
Los Lobos
Desperado (1995)
Spy Kids (2001)
Graeme Revell
From Dusk till Dawn (1996)
Sin City (2005)
The Adventures of Sharkboy and Lavagirl in 3-D (2005)
Planet Terror (2007)
 Himself
Bedhead (1991)
El Mariachi (1992) - Rodriguez is credited as music editor.
Roadracers (1994) - Rodriguez wrote the film's song: "Flying Saucer Baby". 
Spy Kids (2001)
Spy Kids 2: The Island of Lost Dreams (2002)
Spy Kids 3-D: Game Over (2003)
Once Upon a Time in Mexico (2003)
Sin City (2005)
The Adventures of Sharkboy and Lavagirl in 3-D (2005)
Planet Terror (2007)
Shorts (2009)
Machete (2010) - as part of Chingon
Spy Kids: All the Time in the World (2011)
The Black Mamba (2013) short
Two Scoops (2013) short with Carl Thiel
Machete Kills (2013)
Sin City: A Dame to Kill For (2014)
Red 11 (2019)
We Can Be Heroes (2020)
Carl Thiel
Planet Terror (2007)
Shorts (2009)
Spy Kids: All the Time in the World (2011)
Two Scoops (2013) short with Robert Rodriguez.
Machete Kills (2013)
From Dusk till Dawn: The Series (2014—2016)
Sin City: A Dame to Kill For (2014)Nicolas RoegStanley Myers
Eureka (1983)
Insignificance (1985) with Hans Zimmer
Castaway (1986)
Track 29 (1988)
The Witches (1990)
Cold Heaven (1991)
Heart of Darkness (1993)Joachim RønningGeoff Zanelli
Pirates of the Caribbean: Dead Men Tell No Tales (2017)
Maleficent: Mistress of Evil (2019)Mark RosmanChristophe Beck
A Cinderella Story (2004)
The Perfect Man (2005)Stuart RosenbergMarvin Hamlisch
The April Fools (1969)
Move (1970)
Lalo Schifrin
Bob Hope Presents the Chrysler Theatre (1963-1966) - They collaborated on one of the episodes.
Cool Hand Luke (1967)
WUSA (1970)
Voyage of the Damned (1976)
Love and Bullets (1979)
The Amityville Horror (1979)
Brubaker (1980)
Benny Carter
Bob Hope Presents the Chrysler Theatre (1963-1966) - They collaborated on four episodes.
Fame Is the Name of the Game (1966)Rick RosenthalDanny Lux
Strong Medicine (2000) They contributed an episode to the series.
Halloween: Resurrection (2002)
Hack (2002-2004)
Craig Safan
Darkroom (1981-1982)
Life Goes On (1989-1993)
W.G. Snuffy Walden
Early Edition (1996-2000)
Providence (1999-2002)Herbert RossBilly Goldenberg
Play It Again, Sam (1972)
The Last of Sheila (1973)
David Newman
Undercover Blues (1993)
Boys on the Side (1995)
Marvin Hamlisch
Funny Lady (1975) - Additional Music Adaptor
Pennies From Heaven (1981)
I Ought to Be in Pictures (1982)Roberto RosselliniRenzo Rossellini
A Pilot Returns (1942)
The Man with a Cross (1943)
Rome, Open City (1945)
Desire (1946)
Paisan (1946)
Germany, Year Zero (1948)
L'amore (1948)
Stromboli (1950)
The Flowers of St. Francis (1950)
The Machine That Kills Bad People (1952)
Europe '51 (1952)
Rivalry (1953)
Where Is Freedom? (1954)
Fear (1954)
General Della Rovere (1959)
Escape by Night (1960)
Garibaldi (1961)
Vanina Vanini (1961)Eli RothNathan Barr
Cabin Fever (2002)
2001 Maniacs (2005)
Hostel (2005)
Thanksgiving (2007)
Hostel: Part II (2007)
The Last Exorcism (2010)
Hemlock Grove (2013)
The House with a Clock in its Walls (2018)Joe RothJames Newton Howard
Coupe de Ville (1990)
America's Sweethearts (2001)
Freedomland (2006)
The Great Debaters (2007) - Produced by
Snow White & the Huntsman (2012) - Produced by
Maleficent (2014) - Produced by
The Huntsman: Winter's War (2016) - Produced byJoseph RubenMark Mancina
Money Train (1995)
Return to Paradise (1998)
Penthouse North (2013)Alan RudolphMark Isham
Trouble in Mind (1985)
Made in Heaven (1987)
The Moderns (1988)
Love at Large (1990)
Mortal Thoughts (1991)
Mrs. Parker and the Vicious Circle (1994)
Afterglow (1996)
Breakfast of Champions (1999)
Trixie (2000)Raúl RuizJorge Arriagada
Dog's Dialogue (1977)
Les divisions de la nature (1978)
The Suspended Vocation (1978)
The Hypothesis of the Stolen Painting (1979)
Zig-Zag - le jeu de l'oie (1980)
The Territory (1981)
On Top of the Whale (1982)
City of Pirates (1983)
Three Crowns of the Sailor (1983)
Bérénice (1983)
Vanishing Point (1984)
Manoel's Destinies (1985)
Treasure Island (1985)
The Insomniac on the Bridge (1985)
Richard III (1986)
Dans un miroir (1986)
Life Is a Dream (1986)
The Blind Owl (1987)
Le professeur Taranne (1987)
Brise-glace (1987)
Dark at Noon (1993)
Las soledades (1992)
Wind Water (1995)
Three Lives and Only One Death (1996)
Le film à venir (1997)
Genealogies of a Crime (1997)
Shattered Image (1998)
Time Regained (1999)
Comedy of Innocence (2000)
Love Torn in a Dream (2000)
Savage Souls (2001)
Cofralandes, Chilean Rhapsody (2002)
A Place Among the Living (2003)
That Day (2003)
Days in the Country (2004)
Edipo (2004)
The Lost Domain (2005)
Klimt (2006)
La Recta Provincia (2007)
Nucingen House (2008)
Litoral (2008)
The Yellow Passport (2009)
Mysteries of Lisbon (2010)
Ballet aquatique (2011)
Night Across the Street (2012)
Lines of Wellington (2012) - conceived by Ruiz, completed by Valeria SarmientoRichard RushDominic Frontiere
Freebie and the Bean (1974)
The Stunt Man (1980) 
Color of Night (1994)
Ronald Stein
Too Soon to Love (1960)
Of Love and Desire (1963)
Psych-Out (1968)
Getting Straight (1970)Jay RussellWilliam Ross
My Dog Skip (2000)
Tuck Everlasting (2002)
Ladder 49 (2004)
One Christmas Eve (2014)Russo brothersHenry Jackman
Captain America: The Winter Soldier (2014)
Captain America: Civil War (2016)
21 Bridges (2019) - Produced by
Dhaka (2020) - Produced by
Cherry (2021)
The Gray Man (2022)
Alan Silvestri
Avengers: Infinity War (2018)
Avengers: Endgame (2019)Mark RydellDave Grusin
On Golden Pond (1981)
For the Boys (1991)
Even Money (2006)
John Williams
The Reivers (1969)
The Cowboys (1972)
Cinderella Liberty (1973)
The River (1984)
Lalo Schifrin
The Fox (1967)
The Reivers (1969) Rejected Score
James Newton Howard
The Man in the Moon (1991) – Produced by
Intersection (1994)
John Frizzell
Crime of the Century (1996)
James Dean (2001)
Masters of Science Fiction (2007) Episode: "A Clean Escape"

 S Boris SagalBilly Goldenberg
The Harness (1971)
McCloud (1970-1977) - They contributed an episode.
The Diary of Anne Frank (1980)
Dial 'M' for Murder (1981)
Jerry Goldsmith
Playhouse 90 (1956-1960) - They collaborated on one of the episodes of the series.
Cain's Hundred (1961-1962) - They collaborated on a two-part episode of the series.
Dr. Kildare (1961-1966) - They collaborated the pilot and second episode of the first season.
General Electric Theater (1953-1962) - They collaborated on one of the episodes of the series.
The Crimebusters (1962)
Indict and Convict (1974)
Masada (1981) - They contributed the first half, that Goldsmith composed, Morton Stevens composed the second half.
Henry Mancini
Peter Gunn (1958-1961) - They collaborated on some of the episodes of the series.
Mr. Lucky (1959-1960) - They collaborated on six episodes of the series.
The Moneychangers (1976)
Angela (1977)
Fred Karlin
The Dream Makers (1975)
The Awakening Land (1978)
Ike: The War Years (1979)
Walter Scharf
The Travels of Jaimie McPheeters (1963-1964) - They collaborated on three episodes of the series.
Guns of Diablo (1965)Luciano SalceEnnio Morricone
The Fascist (1961)
La voglia matta (1962)
La cuccagna (1962)
El Greco (1964)
Slalom (1965)
Come imparai ad amare le donne (1967)
Dove vai in vacanza? (1978)Carlos SaldanhaJohn Powell
Robots (2005) - Co-Directed by
Ice Age: The Meltdown (2006)
Ice Age: Dawn of the Dinosaurs (2009)
Rio (2011)
Ice Age: Continental Drift (2012) - Executive Producer
Rio 2 (2014)
Ferdinand (2017)Sidney SalkowEmil Newman
The Iron Sheriff (1957)
Chicago Confidential (1957)
The Great Sioux Massacre (1965)David F. SandbergBenjamin Wallfisch
Lights Out (2016)
Annabelle: Creation (2017)
Shazam! (2019)Ari SandelDominic Lewis 
The DUFF (2015)
Goosebumps 2: Haunted Halloween (2018)Chris SandersJohn Powell
How to Train Your Dragon (2010)
How to Train Your Dragon 2 (2014) — Executive Producer
How to Train Your Dragon: The Hidden World (2019) — Executive Producer
The Call of the Wild (2020)
Alan Silvestri
Lilo & Stitch (2002)
The Croods (2013)Joseph SargentCharles Bernstein
White Lightning (1973)
Coast to Coast (1980)
Caroline? (1990)
Ivory Hunters (1990)
The Love She Sought (1990)
Somebody's Daughter (1992)
Miss Evers' Boys (1997)
The Long Island Incident (1998)
Out of the Ashes (2003)
Sybil (2007)
Sweet Nothing in My Ear (2008)
Jerry Goldsmith
The Man from U.N.C.L.E. (1964-1968) - They collaborated on one episode of the series.
The Man (1972)
MacArthur (1977)
Nelson Riddle
The Man from U.N.C.L.E. (1964-1968) - They collaborated on a two-part episode of the series.
The Spy in the Green Hat (1967)
David Shire
The Taking of Pelham One Two Three (1974)
Skylark (1993)
Streets of Laredo (1995)
My Antonia (1995)
Gerald Fried
The Man from U.N.C.L.E. (1964-1968) - They collaborated on few episodes.
One Spy Too Many (1966)
Miles Goodman
Space (1985)
Passion Flower (1986)
Robert Drasnin
The Man from U.N.C.L.E. (1964-1968) - They collaborated on one episode of the series.
Wheeler and Murdoch (1972)
Billy Goldenberg
The Marcus-Nelson Murders (1973)
Memorial Day (1983)
Love Is Never Silent (1985)
There Must Be a Pony (1986)
Miss Rose White (1992)
Morton Stevens
The Man from U.N.C.L.E. (1964-1968) - They collaborated on two episodes.
Man on a String (1972)Jeremy SaulnierBrooke Blair and Will Blair
Murder Party (2007)
Blue Ruin (2013)
Green Room (2015)
Hold the Dark (2018)Claude SautetPhilippe Sarde
The Things of Life (1970)
Max and the Junkmen (1971)
César and Rosalie (1972)
Vincent, François, Paul and the Others (1974)
Mado (1976)
A Simple Story (1978)
A Bad Son (1980)
Garçon! (1983)
The Long Island Incident (1998)
A Few Days with Me (1988)
Nelly and Mr. Arnaud (1995)Victor SavilleHerbert Stothart
The Green Years (1946)
If Winter Comes (1947)
Desire Me (1947)John SaylesMason Daring
Return of the Secaucus Seven (1979)
Lianna (1983)
The Brother from Another Planet (1984)
Matewan (1987)
Eight Men Out (1988)
City of Hope (1991)
Passion Fish (1992)
The Secret of Roan Inish (1994)
Lone Star (1996)
Men With Guns (1997)
Limbo (1999)
Sunshine State (2002)
Silver City (2004)
Honeydripper (2007)
Amigo (2010)
Go for Sisters (2013)Franklin J. SchaffnerMichael J. Lewis
Sphinx (1981)
Yes, Giorgio (1982)
Jerry Goldsmith
Playhouse 90 (1956-1960) - They collaborated on three episodes. 
The Stripper (1963)
Planet of the Apes (1968)
Patton (1970)
Papillon (1973)
Islands in the Stream (1977)
The Boys from Brazil (1978)
Lionheart (1987)
John Williams
Playhouse 90 (1956-1960) - They collaborated on one episode.
Yes, Giorgio (1982) - Williams Wrote the Film's Theme Song: "If We Were in Love"Fred SchepisiJerry Goldsmith
The Russia House (1990)
Mr. Baseball (1992)
Six Degrees of Separation (1993)
I.Q. (1994)
Fierce Creatures (1997)
Bruce Smeaton
The Devil's Playground (1976)
The Chant of Jimmie Blacksmith (1978)
Barbarosa (1982)
Iceman (1984)
Plenty (1985)
Roxanne (1987)
A Cry in the Dark (1988)
Paul Grabowsky
Six Degrees of Separation (1993) - Grabowsky wrote the additional cue for the film.
Last Orders (2001)
It Runs in the Family (2003)
Empire Fall (2003)
The Eye of the Storm (2011)
Words and Pictures (2013)Maria SchraderTobias Wagner
Stefan Zweig: Farewell to Europe (2016)
I'm Your Man (2021)
She Said (2022)Paul SchraderAngelo Badalamenti
The Comfort of Strangers (1990)
Witch Hunt (1994)
Forever Mine (1999)
Auto Focus (2002)
Dominion: Prequel to the Exorcist (2005)
Giorgio Moroder
American Gigolo (1980)
Cat People (1982)
Jack Nitzsche
Blue Collar (1978)
Hardcore (1979)Barbet SchroederJorge Arriagada
Our Lasy of the Assassins (2000)
Terror's Advocate (2007)
Inju: The Beast in the Shadow (2008)
The Venerable W. (2017)
Pink Floyd
More (1969)
La Vallée (1972)
Trevor Jones
Kiss of Death (1995)
Desperate Measures (1998)
Howard Shore
Single White Female (1992)
Before and After (1996)John SchultzRichard Gibbs
Like Mike (2002)
When Zachary Beaver Came to Town (2003)
The Honeymooners (2005)
Judy Moody and the Not Bummer Summer (2011)
Adventures in Babysitting (2016)David SchmoellerPino Donaggio
 Tourist Trap (1979)
 Crawlspace (1986)
 Catacombs (1988)Joel SchumacherDavid Buckley
Blood Creek (2009)
Trespass (2011)
Elliot Goldenthal
Batman Forever (1995)
A Time to Kill (1996)
Batman and Robin (1997)
Harry Gregson-Williams
Phone Booth (2002)
Veronica Guerin (2003)
The Number 23 (2007)
Twelve (2010)
James Newton Howard
Flatliners (1990)
Dying Young (1991)
2000 Malibu Road (1992) - Theme music only
Falling Down (1993)Robert SchwentkeChristophe Beck
Red (2010)
R.I.P.D. (2013)
Martin Todsharow	
Tattoo (2002)
Eierdiebe (2003)
The Captain (2017)
Snake Eyes (2021)
Joseph Trapanese
The Divergent Series: Insurgent (2015)
The Divergent Series: Allegiant (2016)Martin ScorseseElmer Bernstein
The Grifters (1990) - Produced by
Cape Fear (1991)
Mad Dog and Glory (1993) - Produced by
The Age of Innocence (1993)
Search and Destroy (1995) – Executive Producer
A Personal Journey with Martin Scorsese Through American Movies (1995)
Bringing out the Dead (1999)
Gangs of New York (2002) Rejected Score
Howard Shore
After Hours (1985)
Made in Milan (1990)
Gangs of New York (2002)
The Aviator (2004)
The Departed (2006)
Hugo (2011)
Robbie Robertson
Raging Bull (1980) – Robertson is credited as music producer.
The King of Comedy (1982) – Robertson is credited as music producer.
The Color of Money (1986)
Casino (1995) – Music Consultant
Gangs of New York (2002) - Executive Music Producer
The Departed (2006) – Music Producer
Shutter Island (2010) – Music Supervisor
The Wolf of Wall Street (2013) – Executive Music Producer
Silence (2016) – Executive Music Producer
The Irishman (2019)
Killers of the Flower Moon (2023)Ridley ScottJerry Goldsmith
Alien (1979)
Legend (1985) Goldsmith composed the European version. Tangerine Dream composed the US version.
Vangelis
Blade Runner (1982)
1492: Conquest of Paradise (1992)
Hans Zimmer
Black Rain (1989)
Thelma and Louise (1991)
White Squall (1996) - additional music
Gladiator (2000)
Hannibal (2001)
Black Hawk Down (2001)
Matchstick Men (2003)
Harry Gregson-Williams
Kingdom of Heaven (2005)
Prometheus (2012) "Life" theme
The East (2013) - Produced by
Exodus: Gods and Kings (2014) - additional music
The Martian (2015)
The Last Duel (2021)
House of Gucci (2021)
Marc Streitenfeld
A Good Year (2006)
American Gangster (2007)
Body of Lies (2008)
Robin Hood (2010)
Prometheus (2012) Harry Gregson-Williams composed the "Life" theme.
Raised by Wolves (2020–present) – They contributed two episodes that Scott directed for the series.
Daniel Pemberton
The Counselor (2013)
Mark Felt: The Man Who Brought Down the White House (2017) – Produced by
All the Money in the World (2017)
The Journey (2019) shortTony ScottHarold Faltermeyer
Top Gun (1986)
Beverly Hills Cop II (1987)
Harry Gregson-Williams
Revenge (1990) - additional music (director's cut)
Crimson Tide (1995) - Gregson-Williams is credited as choir conductor.
The Fan (1996) - Gregson-Williams is credited as conductor.
Enemy of the State (1998) with Trevor Rabin
The Hunger (1999) Episode "Sanctuary"
Spy Game (2001)
The Hire: Beat the Devil (2002)
Man on Fire (2004)
Domino (2005)
Déjà Vu (2006)
The Taking of Pelham 123 (2009)
Unstoppable (2010)
Hans Zimmer
Days of Thunder (1990)
True Romance (1993)
Crimson Tide (1995)
The Fan (1996)George SeatonVictor Young
Anything Can Happen (1952)
Little Boy Lost (1953)
The Country Girl (1954)
The Proud and Profane (1956)
Alfred Newman
Apartment for Peggy (1948) - additional music
Chicken Every Sunday (1949)
The Big Lift (1950)
For Heaven's Sake (1950)
The Pleasure of His Company (1961)
The Counterfeit Traitor (1962)
Airport (1970)Peter SegalTeddy Castellucci
Anger Management (2003)
50 First Dates (2004)
The Longest Yard (2005)
Trevor Rabin
Get Smart (2008)
Grudge Match (2013)
David Newman
Tommy Boy (1995)
Nutty Professor II: The Klumps (2000)Susan SeidelmanThomas Newman
Desperately Seeking Susan (1985)
Cookie (1989)Henry SelickBruno Coulais
Coraline (2009)
Wendell & Wild (2022)Joann SfarOlivier Daviaud
Gainsbourg: A Heroic Life (2010)
The Rabbi's Cat (2011)
Petit Vampire (2020)Tom ShadyacJohn Debney
Liar Liar (1997)
Dragonfly (2002)
Bruce Almighty (2003)
Evan Almighty (2007)
Brian Banks (2019)S. ShankarA. R. Rahman
Gentleman (1993)
Kadhalan (1994)
Indian (1996)
Jeans (1998)
Mudhalvan (1999)
Nayak: The Real Hero (2001)
Boys (2003)
Sivaji (2007)
Enthiran (2010)
I (2015)Adam ShankmanJohn Debney
The Pacifier (2005)
Cheaper by the Dozen 2 (2005)
Mervyn Warren
The Wedding Planner (2001)
A Walk to Remember (2002)Thea SharrockCraig Armstrong
Me Before You (2016)
The One and Only Ivan (2020)
The Beautiful Game (2023)Ron SheltonBennie Wallace
Bull Durham (1988) – Wallace composed additional music for the film.
Blaze (1989)
White Men Can't Jump (1992)
Alex Wurman
Play It to the Bone (1999) 
Hollywood Homicide (2003)
Just Getting Started (2017)Jim SheridanElmer Bernstein
My Left Foot (1989)
The Field (1990)
Gavin Friday and Maurice Seezer
The Boxer (1997)
In America (2002)
Get Rich or Die Tryin' (2005) with Quincy JonesTaylor SheridanBrian Tyler
Yellowstone (2018–present)
Those Who Wish Me Dead (2021)Gary ShermanJoe Renzetti
Dead & Buried (1981)
Vice Squad (1982) with Keith Rubinstein 
Mysterious Two (1982)
Wanted: Dead or Alive (1987)
Sable (1987)
Poltergeist III (1988)
Lisa (1990)
Murderous Vision (1991)
Missing Persons (1993)
39: A Film by Carroll McKane (2006)Vincent ShermanMax Steiner
The Unfaithful (1947)
Adventures of Don Juan (1948)
The Damned Don't Cry (1950)
Backfire (1950) - additional music
Ice Palace (1960)
Adolph Deutsch
Saturday's Children (1940)
Underground (1941)
All Through the Night (1942)
Across the Pacific (1942)
George Dunning
Harriet Craig (1950)
The Long, Hot Summer (1965-1966) - They contributed one episode of the series.Kaneto ShindōHikaru Hayashi
Lucky Dragon No. 5 (1959)
The Naked Island (1960)
Ningen (1962)
Mother (1963)
Onibaba (1964) 
Akuto (1965) 
Lost Sex. (1966)
Kuroneko (1968)
Heat Wave Island (1969)
Live Today, Die Tomorrow!. (1970)
Sanka (1972)
The Heart (1973)
The Life of Chikuzan. (1977)
Edo Porn (1981)
Burakkubōdo (1986)
Tree Without Leaves. (1986)
Sakura-tai Chiru (1988)
A Last Note (1995)
Will to Live. (1999)
By Player (2000)
Owl (2003)
Postcard (2010)
Akira Ifukube
Children of Hiroshima. (1952)
Epitome (1953)
Life of a Woman (1953)
Dobu. (1954)
Wolf (1955)
Shirogane Shinjū (1956)
Ruri no Kishi. (1956)
An Actress (1956)
Umi no Yarōdomo (1957)
Sorrow Is Only for Women. (1958)Makoto ShinkaiRadwimps
Your Name. (2016)
Weathering with You (2019)
Suzume no Tojimari (2022)
Tenmon
Their Standing Points (1999)
Voices of a Distant Star (2002)
The Place Promised in Our Early Days (2004)
5 Centimeters Per Second (2007)
Ani*Kuri15 (2007) (They contributed on "Neko no shukai")
Children Who Chase Lost Voices (2011) Michael ShowalterMichael Andrews
The Big Sick (2017)
The Lovebirds (2020)
Brian H. Kim
Hello, My Name Is Doris (2015)
Spoiler Alert (2022)
Theodore Shapiro	
Wet Hot American Summer (2001)
The Baxter (2005)
The Eyes of Tammy Faye (2021)Trey Edward ShultsBrian McOmber
Krisha (2014) - Short film
Krisha (2015)
It Comes at Night (2017)M. Night ShyamalanTrevor Gureckis
Servant (2019–present)
Old (2021)

James Newton Howard
The Sixth Sense (1999)
Unbreakable (2000)
Signs (2002)
The Village (2004)
Lady in the Water (2006)
The Happening (2008)
The Last Airbender (2010)
After Earth (2013)
West Dylan Thordson
Split (2016)
Glass (2019)
Edmund Choi
Praying with Anger (1992)
Wide Awake (1998)Charles ShyerAlan Silvestri
Father of the Bride (1991)
Father of the Bride Part II (1995)
The Parent Trap (1998) - Produced by
Bill Conti
Private Benjamin (1980) - Produced by
Baby Boom (1987)Vittorio De SicaAlessandro Cicognini
Shoeshine (1946)
Bicycle Thieves (1948)
Miracle in Milan (1951)
Umberto D. (1952)
Indiscretion of an American Wife (1953)
The Gold of Naples (1954)
The Roof (1956)
Armando Trovajoli
Two Women (1960) 
Boccaccio '70 (1962) (segment "La riffa")
Yesterday, Today and Tomorrow (1963)
Marriage Italian Style (1964)George SidneyGeorge Duning
The Eddy Duchin Story (1956)
Jeanne Eagels (1957)
Pal Joey (1957)
Johnny Green
Pilot #5 (1943) - Green is uncredited as composer.
Bathing Beauty (1944)
Pepe (1960)
Bye Bye Birdie (1963)
Who Has Seen the Wind? (1965)
Miklós Rózsa
The Red Danube (1949)
Young Bess (1953)
Herbert Stothart
Thousands Cheer (1943)
The Three Musketeers (1948)
George Stoll
Holiday in Mexico (1946) - Stoll is credited as musical director.
A Ticklish Affair (1963)
Viva Las Vegas (1964)
Lennie Hayton
Pilot #5 (1943)
Ziegfeld Follies (1945) - Hayton is credited as musical director.Don SiegelHerschel Burke Gilbert
No Time for Flowers (1952)
Riot in Cell Block 11 (1954)
Cyril J. Mockridge
Hound-Dog Man (1959)
Flaming Star (1960)
Leonard Rosenman
Hell Is for Heroes (1962)
Stranger on the Run (1967)
Lalo Schifrin
Coogan's Bluff (1968)
The Beguiled (1971)
Dirty Harry (1971)
Charley Varrick (1973)
Telefon (1977)
Jinxed! (1982) Rejected Score 
Leith Stevens
Private Hell 36 (1954)
The Gun Runners (1958)
Franz Waxman
Night Unto Night (1949)
Crime in the Streets (1956)Brad SilberlingMike Post
Top of the Hill (1989)
Doogie Howser, M.D. (1989-1993)
L.A. Law (1986-1994) They contributed an episode to the series.
The Byrds of Paradise (1994) They contributed an episode to the series.
NYPD Blue (1993-2005)Marisa SilverMiles Goodman
Vital Signs (1990)
He Said, She Said (1991)
Indecency (1992)Elliot SilversteinCharles Fox
Betrayed By Innocence (1986)
Rich Men, Single Women (1990)
Leonard Rosenman
A Man Called Horse (1970)
The Car (1977)
Frank De Vol
Cat Ballou (1965)
The Happening (1967)Justin SimienKris Bowers 
Dear White People (2017-2021)
Bad Hair (2020)
Haunted Mansion (2023)Bryan SingerJohn Ottman
Public Access (1993)
The Usual Suspects (1995)
Apt Pupil (1998)
X2 (2003)
Superman Returns (2006)
Valkyrie (2008)
Jack the Giant Slayer (2013)
X-Men: Days of Future Past (2014)
X-Men: Apocalypse (2016)
Bohemian Rhapsody (2018)John SingletonDavid Arnold
Shaft (2000)
Baby Boy (2001)
2 Fast 2 Furious (2003)
Four Brothers (2005)
Stanley Clarke
Boyz n the Hood (1991)
Poetic Justice (1993)
Higher Learning (1995)Douglas SirkFrank Skinner
Taza, Son of Cochise (1954)
Magnificent Obsession (1954)
Sign of the Pagan (1954)
All That Heaven Allows (1955)
Never Say Goodbye (1956)
Written on the Wind (1956)
Battle Hymn (1957)
Intertude (1957)
The Tarnished Angels (1958)
Imitation of Life (1959)Jerzy SkolimowskiStanley Myers
King, Queen, Knave (1972)
Moonlighting (1982)
Success Is the Best Revenge (1984)
The Lightship (1985)
Torrents of Spring (1989)Kevin SmithChristopher Drake
Tusk (2014)
Holidays (2015) They contributed a segment to the film.
Yoga Hosers (2016)
Moose Jaws (TBA)
James L. Venable
Clerks: The Animated Series (2000)
Jay and Silent Bob Strike Back (2001)
Jersey Girl (2004)
Clerks II (2006)
Zack and Miri Make a Porno (2008)
Jay & Silent Bob's Super Groovy Cartoon Movie (2013)
Jay and Silent Bob Reboot (2019)Jack SmightGil Melle
Partners in Crime (1973)
Frankenstein: The True Story (1973)
Legend in Granite (1973)
John Williams
Alcoa Premiere (1961-1963) - They collaborated on one of the episodes of the series.
The Screaming Woman (1972)
Midway (1976)
Jerry Goldsmith
Studio One (1948-1958) - They collaborated on one episode of the series.
The Illustrated Man (1969)
The Traveling Executioner (1970)
Damnation Alley (1977)
Billy Goldenberg
McCloud (1970-1977) - They collaborated on one episode.
Banacek (1972-1974) - They collaborated on a pilot.
Double Indemnity (1973)
Fred Karlin
Roll of Thunder, Hear My Cry (1978)
Loving Couples (1980)
Percy Faith
I'd Rather Be Rich (1964)
The Third Day (1965)Zack SnyderTyler Bates
Dawn of the Dead (2004)
300 (2007)
Watchmen (2009)
Sucker Punch (2011)
Tom Holkenborg
300: Rise of an Empire (2014) - Produced by
Batman v Superman: Dawn of Justice (2016) With Hans Zimmer.
Army of the Dead (2021)
Zack Snyder's Justice League (2021)
Hans Zimmer
Man of Steel (2013)
Batman v Superman: Dawn of Justice (2016) With Tom Holkenborg.
Wonder Woman 1984 (2020) - Produced by
Army of Thieves (2021) - Produced bySteven SoderberghDavid Holmes
Out of Sight (1998)
Ocean's Eleven (2001)
Ocean's Twelve (2004)
The Good German (2006) Rejected Score 
Ocean's Thirteen (2007)
Haywire (2011)
Logan Lucky (2017)
Mosaic (2018)
The Laundromat (2019)
No Sudden Move (2021)
Cliff Martinez
Sex, Lies, and Videotape (1989)
Kafka (1991)
King of the Hill (1993)
The Underneath (1995)
Gray's Anatomy (1996)
Schizopolis (1996)
The Limey (1999)
Traffic (2000)
Solaris (2002)
Contagion (2011)
The Knick (2014–2015)
Thomas Newman
Erin Brockovich (2000)
The Good German (2006)
Side Effects (2013)
Unsane (2018)
Let Them All Talk (2020) Courtney SolomonJustin Burnett
Dungeons & Dragons (2000)
An American Haunting (2006)
Getaway (2013)Stephen SommersJerry Goldsmith
Deep Rising (1998)
The Mummy (1999)
Alan Silvestri
The Mummy Returns (2001)
Van Helsing (2004)
G.I. Joe: The Rise of Cobra (2009)Barry SonnenfeldDanny Elfman
Men in Black (1997)
Men in Black II (2002)
Men in Black 3 (2012)
James Newton Howard
Big Trouble (2002)
RV (2006)
A Series of Unfortunate Events (2017–2019) – They contributed ten episodes of the series.
Marc Shaiman
The Addams Family (1991)
Addams Family Values (1993)Alberto SordiPiero Piccioni
Smoke Over London (1966)
Scusi, lei è favorevole o contrario? (1966)
An Italian in America (1967)
Help Me, My Love (1969)
Le coppie (1970) - They contributed a segment.
Polvere di stelle (1973)
While There's War There's Hope (1974)
Il comune senso del pudore (1976)
Storia di un italiano (1979)
Io e Caterina (1980)
Io so che tu sai che io so (1982)
In viaggio con papà (1982)
Il tassinaro (1983)
Tutti dentro (1984)
Un tassinaro a New York (1987)
Assolto per aver commesso il fatto (1993)
Nestore l'ultima corsa (1996)
Incontri proibiti (1998)Aaron SorkinDaniel Pemberton
Molly's Game (2017)
The Trial of the Chicago 7 (2020)
Being the Ricardos (2021)Penelope SpheerisWilliam Ross
The Little Rascals (1994)
Black Sheep (1996)
Balls to the Wall (2011)
Lalo Schifrin
The Beverly Hillbillies (1993)
Danger Theatre (1993) – They contributed three episodes in the series.Steven SpielbergBilly Goldenberg
Night Gallery (1969-1973) They contribute the first few episodes.
The Name of the Game (1968-1971) They contributed an episode to the series.
Columbo (1971-2003) They contribute an episode in the series.
Duel (1971)
Gil Melle
The Psychiatrist (1970-1971)
Savage (1973)
David Newman
1941 (1979) – Newman is an uncredited musician.
E.T. the Extra-Terrestrial (1982) – Newman is an uncredited musician.
West Side Story (2021)
John Williams
The Sugarland Express (1974)
Jaws (1975)
Close Encounters of the Third Kind (1977)
1941 (1979)
Raiders of the Lost Ark (1981)
E.T. the Extra-Terrestrial (1982)
Indiana Jones and the Temple of Doom (1984)
Amazing Stories (1985) Episodes "Ghost Train" and "The Mission"
Empire of the Sun (1987)
Always (1989)
Indiana Jones and the Last Crusade (1989)
Hook (1991)
Jurassic Park (1993)
Schindler's List (1993)
The Lost World: Jurassic Park (1997)
Amistad (1997)
Saving Private Ryan (1998)
The Unfinished Journey (1999)
A.I. Artificial Intelligence (2001)
Minority Report (2002)
Catch Me If You Can (2002)
The Terminal (2004)
War of the Worlds (2005)
Munich (2005)
Memoirs of a Geisha (2005) - Produced by
Indiana Jones and the Kingdom of the Crystal Skull (2008)
A Timeless Call (2008) Short 
The Adventures of Tintin (2011)
War Horse (2011)
Lincoln (2012)
The BFG (2016)
The Post (2017)
West Side Story (2021) - Music Consultant
The Fabelmans (2022)
Indiana Jones and the Dial of Destiny (2023) - Executive Producer Chad StahelskiTyler Bates & Joel J. Richard
John Wick (2014)
John Wick: Chapter 2 (2017)
John Wick: Chapter 3 – Parabellum (2019)John M. StahlCyril J. Mockridge
Holy Matrimony (1943)
The Walls of Jericho (1948) with Alfred Newman.
Father Was a Fullback (1949)
Alfred Newman
Immortal Sergeant (1943) - additional music
The Keys of the Kingdom (1944)
Leave Her to Heaven (1945)
The Walls of Jericho (1948) with Cyril J. Mockridge.Sylvester StalloneBill Conti
Paradise Alley (1978)
Rocky II (1979)
Rocky III (1982)
Rocky Balboa (2006)
Brian Tyler
Rambo (2008)
The Expendables (2010)Richard StanleySimon Boswell
Hardware (1990)
Dust Devil (1992)
The Secret Glory (2001)
The White Darkness (2002)
The Otherworld (2013)Andrew StantonThomas Newman
Finding Nemo (2003)
WALL-E (2008)
Finding Dory (2016)Ben StassenRamin Djawadi
Fly Me to the Moon (2008)
A Turtle's Tale: Sammy's Adventures (2010)
A Turtle's Tale 2: Sammy's Escape from Paradise (2012)
The House of Magic (2013)
The Wild Life (2016)George StevensVictor Young
Something to Live For (1952)
Shane (1953)
Franz Waxman
Woman of the Year (1942)
A Place in the Sun (1951)
Alfred Newman
Gunga Din (1939)
Vigil in the Night (1940)
The Diary of Anne Frank (1959)
The Greatest Story Ever Told (1965)
Roy Webb
Kentucky Kernels (1934)
Laddie (1935)
The Nitwits (1935)
Alice Adams (1935)
Quality Street (1937)
Vivacious Lady (1938)
I Remember Mama (1948)Leslie StevensDominic Frontiere
The Marriage-Go-Round (1961)
Hero's Island (1962)
Stoney Burke (1962 - 1963)
The Outer Limits (1963 - 1965)
Mr. Kingston (1964) - Unsold TV pilot. 
Fanfare for a Death Scene (1964)
Incubus (1966)
The Name of the Game (1968 to 1971)
Search (1972 to 1973)Robert StevensonBuddy Baker
The Misadventures of Merlin Jones (1964)
The Monkey's Uncle (1965)
The Gnome-Mobile (1967)
The Shaggy D.A. (1976)
Irwin Kostal
Mary Poppins (1964)
Bedknobs and Broomsticks (1971)
George Bruns
Johnny Tremain (1957)
The Absent Minded Professor (1961)
Son of Flubber (1963)
The Love Bug (1968)
Herbie Rides Again (1974)
Sherman Brothers
The Misadventures of Merlin Jones (1964)
Mary Poppins (1964)
Bedknobs and Broomsticks (1971)
 Robert Brunner
The Misadventures of Merlin Jones (1964) - Orchestrator.
That Darn Cat! (1965)
Blackbeard's Ghost (1968)
Oliver Wallace
Old Yeller (1957)
Darby O'Gill and the Little People (1959)
Leigh Harline
Know Your Ally: Britain (1944) – Harline is an uncredited composer for the film.
The Woman on Pier 13 (1949)
The Las Vegas Story (1952)
Friedrich Hollaender
Walk Softly, Stranger (1950)
My Forbidden Past (1951)Ben StillerTheodore Shapiro
DodgeBall: A True Underdog Story (2004) - Produced by
Blades of Glory (2007) - Produced by
Tropic Thunder (2008)
The Secret Life of Walter Mitty (2013)
Zoolander 2 (2016)
Why Him? (2016) - Produced byWhit StillmanMark Suozzo
Metropolitan (1990)
Barcelona (1994)
The Last Days of Disco (1998)
Damsels in Distress (2011)
Love & Friendship (2016) - Additional musicJohn StockwellPaul Haslinger
Cheaters (2000)
Crazy/Beautiful (2001)
Blue Crush (2002)
Into the Blue (2005)
Turistas (2006)
Seal Team Six: The Raid on Osama Bin Laden (2012)
In the Blood (2014)Nicholas StollerLyle Workman
Forgetting Sarah Marshall (2008)
Get Him to the Greek (2010)
Michael Andrews
The Five-Year Engagement (2012)
Neighbors (2014)
Neighbors 2: Sorority Rising (2016)Charles Stone IIIJohn Powell
Drumline (2002)
Mr. 3000 (2004)Oliver StoneCraig Armstrong
World Trade Center (2006)
Wall Street: Money Never Sleeps (2010)
The Untold History of the United States (2012-2013)
Snowden (2016)
Stewart Copeland
Wall Street (1987)
Talk Radio (1988)
Georges Delerue
Salvador (1986)
Platoon (1986)
John Williams
Born on the Fourth of July (1989)
JFK (1991)
Nixon (1995)Tim StoryChristopher Lennertz
Think Like a Man (2012)
Ride Along (2014)
Think Like a Man Too (2014)
Ride Along 2 (2016)
Shaft (2019)
Tom and Jerry (2021)
John Ottman
Fantastic Four (2005)
Fantastic Four: Rise of the Silver Surfer (2007)
Eric Reed
One of Us Tripped (1997)
The Firing Squad (1999)Mel StuartLalo Schifrin
The Way Out Men (1965)
Wall Street Where the Money is (1966)
The Making of a President: 1964 (1965)
I Love My Wife (1970)
Up From The Ape (1975)
Brenda Starr (1976)
Elmer Bernstein
D-Day June 6, 1944 (1962)
The Making of the President 1960 (1963)
Biography of a Rookie: The Willie Davis Story (1963) - Music Supervisor
Four Days in November (1964)
The Way Out Men (1965) - Music Supervisor
The Chisholms (1980)
Ripley's Believe It or Not! (1982-1986) - They contributed an episode in the second-season premiere.
Fred Karlin
Life Goes to the Movies (1976)
Mean Dog Blues (1978)
Sophia Loren: Her Own Story (1980)
Walter Scharf
If It's Tuesday, This Must Be Belgium (1969)
Willy Wonka & the Chocolate Factory (1971)
The Triangle Factory Fire Scandal (1979)John SturgesJerry Goldsmith
The Satan Bug (1965)
Hour of the Gun (1967)
Elmer Bernstein
The Magnificent Seven (1960)
By Love Possessed (1961)
A Girl Named Tamiko (1962)
The Great Escape (1963)
The Hallelujah Trail (1965)
McQ (1974)
Lalo Schifrin
Joe Kidd (1972)
The Eagle Has Landed (1976)
Dimitri Tiomkin
Jeopardy (1953)
Gunfight at the O.K. Corral (1957)
The Old Man and the Sea (1958)
Last Train from Gun Hill (1959)
David Raksin
The Magnificent Yankee (1950)
Kind Lady (1951)
The Girl in White (1952)Jeannot SzwarcDanny Lux
Ally McBeal (2000-2004)
Boston Legal (2004-2008)
Grey's Anatomy (2010–present)
Charles Fox
The Weekend Nun (1972)
Bug (1975)

 T Isao Takahata 

Michio Mamiya
Horus: Prince of the Sun (1968)
Gauche the Cellist (1982)
The Story of Yanagawa's Canals (1987)
Grave of the Fireflies (1988)
Katsu Hoshi
Chie the Brat (1981)
Only Yesterday (1991)
Joe Hisaishi
Nausicaa of the Valley of the Wind (1984) - Produced by
Castle in the Sky (1986) - Produced by
The Tale of the Princess Kaguya (2013)Yōjirō TakitaJoe Hisaishi
When the Last Sword is Drawn (2002)
Departures (2008)
Tenchi: The Samurai Astronomer (2012)Rachel TalalayGraeme Revell
Ghost In The Machine (1993)
Tank Girl (1995)Andrei TarkovskyEduard Artemyev
Solaris (1972)
Mirror (1974)
Stalker (1979)Béla TarrMihály Vig
Almanac of Fall (1984)
Damnation (1988)
Utolsó hajó (1990) (short film)
Satantango (1994)
Journey on the Plain (1995) (short film)
Werckmeister Harmonies (2000)
Visions of Europe (2004) (segment "Prologue")
The Man from London (2007)
The Turin Horse (2011)Genndy TartakovskyTyler Bates
Sym-Bionic Titan (2010–2011)
Samurai Jack (2017)
Primal (2019–present)
Mark Mothersbaugh
Hotel Transylvania (2012)
Hotel Transylvania 2 (2015)
Hotel Transylvania 3: Summer Vacation (2018)
Hotel Transylvania: Transformania (2022) - Executive Producer
James L. Venable
Samurai Jack (2001–2004)
Star Wars: The Clone Wars (2003–2005)Frank TashlinFrank De Vol
The Glass Bottom Boat (1966)
Caprice (1967)
Joseph J. Lilley
Who's Minding the Store? (1963)
The Disorderly Orderly (1964)
Cyril J. Mockridge
The Lieutenant Wore Skirts (1956)
Will Success Spoil Rock Hunter? (1957)
Lionel Newman
The Girl Can't Help It (1956)
Will Success Spoil Rock Hunter? (1957) - Conductor
Say One for Me (1959)
Walter Scharf
Hollywood or Bust (1956)
Rock-A-Bye Baby (1958)
The Geisha Boy (1958)
Cinderfella (1960)
It's Only Money (1962)Norman TaurogJeff Alexander
Double Trouble (1967)
Speedway (1968)
Walter Scharf
You Can't Have Everything (1937)
Are Husbands Necessary? (1942) - Scharf is uncredited as orchestrator.
Living It Up (1954)
You're Never Too Young (1955)
The Birds and the Bees (1956)
Bundle of Joy (1956)
Don't Give Up the Ship (1959)
Tickle Me (1965)Tate TaylorThomas Newman
The Help (2011)
Get on Up (2014)Don TaylorCharles Bernstein
Secret Weapon (1985)
Ghost of a Chance (1987)
Jerry Goldsmith
Escape from the Planet of the Apes (1971)
The Hemingway Play (1976) with Lee Holdridge.
Damien: Omen II (1978)
Lalo Schifrin
Mannix (1967-1975) - They collaborated on one episode.
The Big Valley (1965–1969) – They collaborated on one episode.
Night Games (1974)
Nelson Riddle
The Rogues (1964-1965) - They collaborated on two episodes.
A Circle of Children (1977)
John Williams
Checkmate (1960-1962) - They collaborated on three episodes.
The Tammy Grimes Show (1966) - They collaborated on one episode.
Tom Sawyer (1973)Julie TaymorElliot Goldenthal
Fool's Fire (1992)
Titus (1999)
Frida (2002)
Across the Universe (2007)
The Tempest (2010)
A Midsummer Night's Dream (2014)
The Glorias (2020)Bertrand TavernierPhilippe Sarde
The Clockmaker of St. Paul (1974)
The Judge and The Assassin (1976)
Spoiled Children (1977)
Coup de Torchon (1981)
L.627 (1992)
Revenge of the Musketeers (1994)
The Princess of Montpensier (2010) 
The French Minister (2013)Gary Templeton 
Harry Manfredini
 The Case of the Cosmic Comic (1976)
 Angus Lost (1983)
 Corduroy (1984)
 A Boy, A Dog, and A Frog (1985)
 Frog goes to Dinner (1985)
 A Pocket for Corduroy (1986)
 There's A Nightmare in My Closet (1987)
 Frog, Where Are You? (1995)
 Frog On His Own (1995)
 Amanda and the Mysterious Carpet (1995)
 Angus and the Ducks (1997)Andy TennantGeorge Fenton
Ever After (1998)
Anna and the King (1999)
Sweet Home Alabama (2002)
Hitch (2005)
Fool's Gold (2008)
The Bounty Hunter (2010)
Wild Oats (2016)
The Secret: Dare to Dream (2020)
Unit 234 (2023)Masaaki TezukaMichiru Oshima
Godzilla vs Megaguirus (2000)
Godzilla vs Mechagodzilla (2002)
Godzilla: Tokyo S.O.S. (2003)Betty ThomasRichard Gibbs
Doctor Dolittle (1998)
28 Days (2000)
I Spy (2002)
John Tucker Must Die (2006)
WIGS (2012–2013) - Thomas directed the series AudreyJ. Lee ThompsonJerry Goldsmith
The Chairman (1969)
The Reincarnation of Peter Proud (1975)
Caboblanco (1980)
King Solomon's Mines (1985)
John Williams
The Guns of Navarone (1961) - Williams is uncredited as music arranger on the exit music for the film's international version.
John Goldfarb, Please Come Home (1965)
Stanley Black
As Long as They're Happy (1955)
An Alligator Named Daisy (1955)
Laurie Johnson
No Trees in the Street (1959)
I Aim at the Stars (1960)
Phillip Green
Murder Without Crime (1950)
The Yellow Balloon (1953)
Robert O. Ragland
10 to Midnight (1983)
Death Wish 4: The Crackdown (1987) - Music Consultant 
Messenger of Death (1989)
Valentine McCallum
Murphy's Law (1986)
Death Wish 4: The Crackdown (1987)
Dimitri Tiomkin
The Guns of Navarone (1961)
Mackenna's Gold (1969) – Produced byRichard ThorpeMiklós Rózsa
Ivanhoe (1952)
All the Brothers Were Valiant (1953)
Knights of the Round Table (1953)
Tip on a Dead Jockey (1957)
Andre Previn
Big Jack (1949)
Challenge to Lassie (1949)
Three Little Words (1950)
The Girl Who Had Everything (1953)
Herbert Stothart
Three Hearts for Julia (1943) 
Big Jack (1949)
Johnny Green
Fiesta (1947)
The Great Caruso (1951)
It's a Big Country (1951)
Carbine Williams (1952) - Green is uncredited as orchestrator.Rawson Marshall ThurberTheodore Shapiro
DodgeBall: A True Underdog Story (2004)
The Mysteries of Pittsburgh (2008)
We're the Millers (2013) With Ludwig Göransson
Central Intelligence (2016) With Ludwig GöranssonGeorge Tillman, Jr.Mark Isham
Men of Honor (2000)
The Inevitable Defeat of Mister and Pete (2013)
The Longest Ride (2015)Norman TokarBuddy Baker
Rascal (1969)
The Apple Dumpling Gang (1975)
No Deposit, No Return (1976)
Sherman Brothers
Big Red (1962)
The Happiest Millionaire (1967)
George Bruns
The Ugly Dachshund (1966)
Follow Me, Boys! (1966)
The Horse in the Gray Flannel Suit (1968)Giuseppe TornatoreEnnio Morricone
Cinema Paradiso (1989)
Everybody's Fine (1990)
Especially on Sunday (1991) - They contributed a segment.
A Pure Formality (1994)
The Star Maker (1995)
The Legend of 1900 (1998)
Malèna (2000)
The Unknown Woman (2006)
Baarìa (2009)
The Best Offer (2013)
The Correspondence (2016)Guillermo del ToroMarco Beltrami
Mimic (1997)
Blade II (2002)
Hellboy (2004)
Don't Be Afraid of the Dark (2010)
Scary Stories to Tell in the Dark (2019) - Produced by 
Alexandre Desplat
The Shape of Water (2017)
Pinocchio (2022)
Ramin Djawadi
Pacific Rim (2013)
The Strain (2014-2015) - Episode Night Zero and prologue of BK, NY
Javier Navarrete
The Devil's Backbone (2001)
Pan's Labyrinth (2006)
Antlers (2020) - Produced byAndre De TothDavid Buttolph
Carson City (1952)
House of Wax (1953)
Crime Wave (1953) 
Thunder Over the Plains (1953)
Riding Shotgun (1954)
The Bounty Hunter (1954)Jacques TourneurRoy Webb
Cat People (1942)
I Walked with a Zombie (1943)
The Leopard Man (1943)
Experiment Perilous (1944)
Out of the Past (1947)
Easy Living (1949)Robert TownsendStanley Clarke
The Five Heartbeats (1991)
B*A*P*S (1997)Dan TrachtenbergBear McCreary
10 Cloverfield Lane (2016)
Black Mirror (2016) - Episode PlaytestBrian Trenchard-SmithBrian May
Turkey Shoot (1982)
Frog Dreaming (1986)Colin TrevorrowMichael Giacchino
Jurassic World (2015)
The Book of Henry (2017)
Jurassic World: Fallen Kingdom (2018) - Written by
Jurassic World Dominion (2022)Joachim TrierOla Fløttum
Reprise (2006)
Oslo, August 31st (2011)
Louder Than Bombs (2015)
Thelma (2017)Gary Trousdale & Kirk WiseAlan Menken
Beauty and the Beast (1991)
The Hunchback of Notre Dame (1996)François TruffautGeorges Delerue
Shoot the Piano Player (1960)
Jules and Jim (1961)
The Soft Skin (1964)
Two English Girls (1971)
Such a Gorgeous Kid Like Me (1972)
Day for Night (1973)
Love on the Run (1979)
The Last Metro (1980)
The Woman Next Door (1981)
Confidentially Yours (1983)
Bernard Herrmann
Fahrenheit 451 (1966)
The Bride Wore Black (1968)Douglas TrumbullAlan Silvestri
Back to the Future: The Ride (1991) short
In Search of the Obelisk (1993) short
James Horner
Brainstorm (1983)
Let's Go (1985) ShortJon TurteltaubTrevor Rabin
National Treasure (2004)
National Treasure: Book of Secrets (2007)
The Sorcerer's Apprentice (2010)David TwohyGraeme Revell
Pitch Black (2000)
Below (2002)
The Chronicles of Riddick (2004)
Riddick (2013)Nora TwomeyMychael Danna & Jeff Danna
The Breadwinner (2017)
My Father's Dragon (2021)

 U Ron UnderwoodJohn Powell
The Adventures of Pluto Nash (2002)
Stealing Sinatra (2003)
Marc Shaiman
City Slickers (1991)
Heart and Souls (1993)
Speechless (1994)

 V Agnès VardaJoanna Bruzdowicz
Vagabond (1985)
Le petit amour (1988)
Jacquot de Nantes (1991)
The Gleaners and I (2000)
The Gleaners and I: Two Years Later (2002)
Le lion volatil (2003) - Short film
The Beaches of Agnès (2008) with Stéphane VilarW. S. Van DykeHerbert Stothart
The Cuban Love Song (1931)
Laughing Boy (1934)
San Francisco (1936)
After the Thin Man (1936)
Rosalie (1937)
Marie Antoinette (1938)
Sweethearts (1938)
Bitter Sweet (1940)
I Married an Angel (1942)
Cairo (1942)Gus Van SantDanny Elfman
To Die For (1995)
Good Will Hunting (1997)
Psycho (1998) Elfman adapted the original score.
Milk (2008)
Restless (2011)
Promised Land (2012)
When We Rise (2017) - They contributed a two-part episode.
Don't Worry, He Won't Get Far on Foot (2018)Matthew VaughnIlan Eshkeri
Layer Cake (2004)
Stardust (2007)
Kick-Ass (2010)
Henry Jackman
Kick-Ass (2010)
X-Men: First Class (2011)
Kingsman: The Secret Service (2015)
Kingsman: The Golden Circle (2017)Gore VerbinskiAlan Silvestri
MouseHunt (1997)
The Mexican (2001)
Hans Zimmer
The Ring (2002)
Pirates of the Caribbean: The Curse of the Black Pearl (2003) Klaus Badelt wrote the additional score.
The Weather Man (2005)
Pirates of the Caribbean: Dead Man's Chest (2006)
Pirates of the Caribbean: At World's End (2007)
Rango (2011)
The Lone Ranger (2013)Henri VerneuilGeorges Delerue
La Francaise et l'amour (1960) English: Love and the Frenchwoman 
Greed in the Sun (1964)
The 25th Hour (1967)
Les Morfalous (1984) English: The VulturesPaul VerhoevenAnne Dudley
Black Book (2006)
Elle (2016)
Benedetta (2021)
Jerry Goldsmith
Total Recall (1990)
Basic Instinct (1992)
Hollow Man (2000)
Basil Poledouris
Flesh & Blood (1985)
RoboCop (1987)
Starship Troopers (1997)
Rogier van Otterloo
Turkish Delight (1973)
Keetje Tippel (1975)
Soldier of Orange (1977)
Voor Koningin en Vaderland (1979)
Jan Stoeckart
Floris (1969)
Diary of a Hooker (1971)King VidorMax Steiner
Bird of Paradise (1932)
Beyond the Forest (1949)
The Fountainhead (1949)
Lightning Strikes Twice (1951)
Alfred Newman
Street Scene (1931)
Cynara (1932)
Our Daily Bread (1934)
The Wedding Night (1935)
Stella Dallas (1937)Denis VilleneuvePierre Desrochers
August 32nd on Earth (1998)
Maelström (2000)
Jóhann Jóhannsson
Prisoners (2013)
Sicario (2015)
Arrival (2016)
Hans Zimmer 
Blade Runner 2049 (2017)
Dune (2021)
Dune: Part Two (2023)Robert VinceBrahm Wenger
Air Bud (1997) - Produced by 
Air Bud: Golden Receiver (1998) - Produced by 
MVP: Most Valuable Primate (2000)
MVP 2: Most Vertical Primate (2001)
Air Bud: Seventh Inning Fetch (2002)
MXP: Most Xtreme Primate (2003)
Chestnut: Hero of Central Park (2004)
Spymate (2006)
Air Buddies (2006)
Snow Buddies (2008)
Space Buddies (2009)
Santa Buddies (2009)
The Search for Santa Paws (2010)
Spooky Buddies (2011)
Treasure Buddies (2012)
Santa Paws 2: The Santa Pups (2012)
Super Buddies (2013)
Russell Madness (2015)
Monkey Up (2016)
Pup Star (2016)
Pup Star: Better 2Gether (2017)
Pup Star: World Tour (2018)
Puppy Star Christmas (2018)
Pup Academy (2019–present)

 W The WachowskisDon Davis
Bound (1996)
The Matrix (1999)
The Animatrix (2003)
The Matrix Reloaded (2003)
The Matrix Revolutions (2003)
Michael Giacchino 
Speed Racer (2008)
Jupiter Ascending (2015)Lana WachowskiJohnny Klimek & Tom Tykwer
Cloud Atlas (2012)
Sense8 (2015–2018) 
The Matrix Resurrections (2021)David WainCraig Wedren
Aisle Six (1992) - Short film 
The State (1993 - 1995)
Wet Hot American Summer (2001)
Stella (2005)
The Ten (2007)
Wainy Days (2007)
Role Models (2008)
Wanderlust (2012)
They Came Together (2014)
A to Z (2014) - They collaborated on an episode. 
Wet Hot American Summer: First Day of Camp (2015)
The Second Sound Barrier (2016) - Short film
Wet Hot American Summer: Ten Years Later (2017)
A Futile and Stupid Gesture (2018) Taika WaititiThe Phoenix Foundation
Eagle vs Shark (2007)
Boy (2010)
Michael Giacchino
Jojo Rabbit (2019)
Thor: Love and Thunder (2022)
Next Goal Wins (2023)Chris WalasChristopher Young
The Fly II (1989)
The Vagrant (1992)Randall WallaceNick Glennie-Smith
The Man in the Iron Mask (1998)
We Were Soldiers (2002)
Secretariat (2010)
Heaven Is for Real (2014)Raoul WalshFranz Waxman
Objective, Burma! (1945)
A Lion Is in the Streets (1953)
Max Steiner
They Died with Their Boots On (1941)
Desperate Journey (1942)
The Man I Love (1946)
Pursued (1947)
Cheyenne (1947)
Fighter Squadron (1948)
White Heat (1949)
Distant Drums (1951)
Battle Cry (1955)
Band of Angels (1957)
A Distant Trumpet (1964)
Adolph Deutsch
They Drive by Night (1940)
High Sierra (1941)
Manpower (1941)
Northern Pursuit (1943)
Uncertain Glory (1944)
Hugo Friedhofer
The Man I Love (1947) - Orchestrator.
Cheyenne (1947) - Orchestrator.
The Revolt of Mamie Stover (1956)
Victor Young
Klondike Annie (1936) - Young is an uncredited composer.
Dark Command (1940)
Blackbeard the Pirate (1952)
The Tall Men (1955)Fred WaltonDana Kaproff
When the Stranger Calls (1979)
I Saw What You Did (1988)
Homewrecker (1992)
When a Stranger Calls Back (1993)
Dead Air (1994)
The Stepford Husbands (1996)James WanJoseph Bishara
Insidious (2010)
The Conjuring (2013)
Insidious: Chapter 2 (2013)
The Conjuring 2 (2016)
Charlie Clouser
Saw (2004)
Dead Silence (2007)
Death Sentence (2007)
Rupert Gregson-Williams
Aquaman (2018)
Aquaman and the Lost Kingdom (2023)David S. WardJames Newton Howard
Major League (1989)
King Ralph (1991)
Major League II (1994) – (additional music)Régis WargnierPatrick Doyle
Indochine (1992) 
A French Woman (1995)
East/West (1999)
Man to Man (2005)
Have Mercy on Us All (2007)
La Ligne droite (2011)Denzel WashingtonMarcelo Zarvos
Fences (2016)
A Journal for Jordan (2021)Shinichirō WatanabeYoko Kanno
Macross Plus (1994)
Cowboy Bebop (1998-1999)
Cowboy Bebop: The Movie (2001)
Genius Party (2007) – segment Baby Blue
Kids on the Slope (2012)
Terror in Resonance (2014)John WatersBasil Poledouris
Serial Mom (1994)
Cecil B. Demented (2000)Mark WatersRolfe Kent
The House of Yes (1997) with Michael Glenn Williams
Freaky Friday (2003)
Mean Girls (2004)
Just Like Heaven (2005)
Ghosts of Girlfriends Past (2009)
Mr. Popper's Penguins (2011)
Vampire Academy (2014)
Magic Camp (2020) Jon WattsMichael Giacchino
Spider-Man: Homecoming (2017)
Spider-Man: Far From Home (2019)
Spider-Man: No Way Home (2021)Scott WaughNathan Furst
Act of Valor (2012)
Need For Speed (2014)
6 Below: Miracle on the Mountain (2017)
Project X-Traction (2021)Keenen Ivory WayansTeddy Castellucci
White Chicks (2004)
Little Man (2006)Robert D. WebLionel Newman
The Proud Ones (1956)
Love Me Tender (1956)
The Way to the Gold (1957)Marc WebbRob Simonsen
500 Days of Summer (2009)
Gifted (2017)Simon WellsJames Horner
An American Tail: Fievel Goes West (1991)
We're Back! A Dinosaur's Story (1993)
Balto (1995)Lo WeiJoseph Koo
Fist of Fury (1972)
A Man Called Tiger (1973)Peter WeirMaurice Jarre
The Year of Living Dangerously (1982)
Witness (1985)
The Mosquito Coast (1986)
Dead Poets Society (1989)
Fearless (1993)
Burkhard von Dallwitz
The Truman Show (1998)
The Way Back (2010)Sam WeismanMarc Shaiman
George of the Jungle (1997)
The Out-of-Towners (1999)Chris WeitzAlexandre Desplat
The Golden Compass (2007)
The Twilight Saga: New Moon (2009)
A Better Life (2011)
Operation Finale (2018)Orson WellesBernard Herrmann
Citizen Kane (1941)
The Magnificent Ambersons (1942)
Michel Legrand
F for Fake (1974)
The Other Side of the Wind (2018)Audrey WellsChristophe Beck
Guinevere (1999)
Under the Tuscan Sun (2003)William A. WellmanVictor Young
The Light That Failed (1939)
Reaching for the Sun (1941)
Light's Diamond Jubilee (special) (1954) - They contributed this special.
Alfred Newman
Looking for Trouble (1934) - additional music
Call of the Wild (1935)
Beau Geste (1939)
Roxie Hart (1942)
The Iron Curtain (1948)
Yellow Sky (1948)
Herbert Stothart
Small Town Girl (1936)
Robin Hood of El Dorado (1936)Wim WendersJürgen Knieper
The Goalie's Anxiety at the Penalty Kick (1972)
The Scarlet Letter (1973)
Wrong Move (1975)
The American Friend (1977)
Room 666 (1982)
The State of Things (1982)
Wings of Desire (1987)
Lisbon Story (1994)
Ry Cooder
Paris, Texas (1984)
The End of Violence (1997) with DJ Shadow and Howie BPaul WendkosBilly Goldenberg
Fear No Evil (1969)
Terror on the Beach (1973)
The Legend of Lizzie Borden (1975)
Intimate Agony (1983)
The Awakening of Candra (1983)
Scorned and Swindled (1984)
Rage of Angels: The Story Continues (1986)
Message from Nam (1993)
John Williams
Gidget (1959) - Orchestrator.
Because They're Young (1960)
Gidget Goes to Rome (1963)
Kraft Suspense Theatre (1963) Episode "The Machine That Played God"
Jerry Goldsmith
Face of a Fugitive (1959)
The Brotherhood of the Bell (1970)
The Mephisto Waltz (1971)
Charles Bernstein
Guilty Until Proven Innocent (1991)
Trial: The Price of Passion (1992)
George Duning
Gidget Goes Hawaiian (1961)
The Big Valley (1965-1969) - They contributed one of the episodes.
Fred Karlin
The Death of Richie (1977)
The Five of Me (1981)
Lalo Schifrin
Special Delivery (1976)
God Against Evil (1977)
Elmer Bernstein
Guns of the Magnificent Seven (1969)
Cannon for Cordoba (1970)
Brad Fiedel
Cocaine: One Man's Seduction (1983)
Right to Die (1987)
Gil Melle
The Taking of Flight 847: The Uli Derickson Story (1988)
From the Dead of Night (1989)
Good Cops, Bad Cops (1990)Peter WernerJames Newton Howard
Men (1989) – They collaborated on the pilot episode of the series.
The Image (1990)
Basil Poledouris
No Man's Land (1987)
Ned Blessing: The True Story of My Life (1992)Ti WestJeff Grace
 The Roost (2005)
 Trigger Man (2007)
 The House of the Devil (2009)
 The Innkeepers (2011)
 In a Balley of Violence (2016)John WhitesellJohn Debney
See Spot Run (2001)
Malibu's Most Wanted (2003)Richard WhorfJohnny Green
The Sailor Takes a Wife (1945)
It Happened in Brooklyn (1947)Billy WilderAndré Previn
One, Two, Three (1961)
Irma la Douce (1963)
Kiss Me, Stupid (1964)
The Fortune Cookie (1966)
Miklós Rózsa
Five Graves to Cairo (1943)
Double Indemnity (1944)
The Lost Weekend (1945)
The Private Life of Sherlock Holmes (1970)
Fedora (1978)
Adolph Deutsch
Some Like It Hot (1959) - Background Music
The Apartment (1960)
Franz Waxman
Mauvaise Graine (1931)
Sunset Boulevard (1950)
Stalag 17 (1953)
The Spirit of St. Louis (1957)
Love in the Afternoon (1957) - Music Adaptor
Friedrich Hollander
A Foreign Affair (1948)
Sabrina (1954)Gene WilderJohn Morris
The Adventure of Sherlock Holmes' Smarter Brother (1975)
The World's Greatest Lover (1977)
The Woman in Red (1984)
Haunted Honeymoon (1986)Chris WilliamsMark Mancina
Moana (2016) - Co-Directed by
The Sea Beast (2022)Simon WincerLaurence Rosenthal
The Young Indiana Jones Chronicles (1992-1993) - They collaborated on six episodes.
The Echo of Thunder (1998)
Basil Poledouris
Lonesome Dove (1989)
Quigley Down Under (1990)
Harley Davidson and the Marlboro Man  (1991)
Free Willy (1993)
Crocodile Dundee in Los Angeles (2001)
David Newman
Operation Dumbo Drop (1995)
The Phantom (1996)
Bruce Rowland
Phar Lap (1983)
Lightning Jack (1994)
Flash (1997)
Ponderosa (2001-2002) - They contributed on one of the episodes in the series.
The Cup (2011)
Eric Colvin
Escape: Human Cargo (1998)
Murder She Purred: A Mrs. Murphy Mystery (1998)
Crossfire Trail (2001)
Monte Walsh (2003)
NASCAR 3D: The IMAX Experience (2004)
Brian May
One More Minute (1979)
Harlequin (1980)
The Last Frontier (1986)
Mario Millo
Against the Wind (1978)
The Lighthorsemen (1987) Harry WinerBruce Broughton
House Arrest (1996)
Jeremiah (1998)
Damaged Care (2002)
The Dive from Clausen's Pier (2005)Adam WingardJunkie XL
Godzilla vs. Kong (2021)
Godzilla vs. Kong 2 (2024)Irwin WinklerMark Isham
The Net (1995)
At First Sight (1999)
Life as a House (2001)
James Newton Howard
Guilty by Suspicion (1991)
Night and the City (1992)
The Juror (1996) – Produced by
Stephen Endelman
De-Lovely (2004)
Home of the Brave (2006)Michael WinnerJimmy Page
Death Wish II (1982)
Death Wish III (1985)
Jerry Fielding
Lawman (1971)
The Nightcomers (1971)
Chato's Land (1972)
The Mechanic (1972)
Scorpio (1973)
The Big Sleep (1978)
Francis Lai
Hannibal Brooks (1969)
The Games (1970)
Stanley Black
West 11 (1963)
The System (1964)Robert WiseRoy Webb
The Curse of the Cat People (1944)
The Body Snatcher (1945)
Jerry Goldsmith
The Sand Pebbles (1966)
Star Trek:The Motion Picture (1979)
Irwin Kostal
West Side Story (1961) – Jerome Robbins co–directed this film.
The Sound of Music (1965)
David Shire
Two People (1973)
The Hindenburg (1975)
Max Steiner
So Big (1953)
Helen of Troy (1955)George C. WolfeBranford Marsalis
The Immortal Life of Henrietta Lacks (2017)
Ma Rainey's Black Bottom (2020)James WongShirley Walker
Space: Above and Beyond (1995–1996) – Executive Producer
The Notorious 7 (1997) - Produced by
Final Destination (2000)
Willard (2003) - Produced by
Final Destination 3 (2006)
Black Christmas (2006) - Produced byKar-Wai WongShigeru Umebayashi
In the Mood for Love (2000)
2046 (2004)
The Grandmaster (2013)John WooJohn Powell
Face/Off (1997)
Paycheck (2003)
Hans Zimmer
Broken Arrow (1996)
Face/Off (1997) Score Producer
Mission: Impossible 2 (2000)Sam WoodHerbert Stothart
The Barbarian (1933)
Christopher Bean (1933)
A Night at the Opera (1935)Park Chan-wookYeong-wook Jo
Joint Security Area (2000)
Yeoseot gae ui siseon (2003)
Oldboy (2003)
Lady Vengeance (2005)
I'm a Cyborg, But That's Ok (2006)
Thirst (2009)
Night Fishing (2011)
Bitter Sweet Seoul (2014)
The Handmaiden (2016)
The Little Drummer Girl (2018)
Decision to Leave (2022)Edgar WrightDavid Arnold
Hot Fuzz (2007)
Don't (2007)
Steven Price
The World's End (2013)
Baby Driver (2017)
Last Night in Soho (2021)Joe WrightDario Marianelli
Pride & Prejudice (2005)
Atonement (2007)
The Soloist (2009)
Anna Karenina (2012)
Darkest Hour (2017)Donald WryeChris Boardman
Broken Promises: Taking Emily Back (1993)
Ultimate Betrayal (1994)
Basil Poledouris
Fire on the Mountain (1981)
The House of God (1984)
Amerika (1987)
Fred Karlin
The Man Who Could Talk to Kids (1973)
Born Innocent (1974)
Death Be Not Proud (1975)
Richard Marvin
Separated by Murder (1994)
Trail of Tears (1996)
Gary Chang
83 Hours 'Til Dawn (1990)
Range of Motion (2000)
Marvin Hamlisch
The Entertainer (1975)
Ice Castles (1978)William WylerAlfred Newman
These Three (1936)
Dodsworth (1936)
Come and Get It (1936) – Howard Hawks co-directed this film.
Dead End (1937)
Wuthering Heights (1939)
The Westerner (1940) with Dimitri Tiomkin.
Dimitri Tiomkin
The Westerner (1940) with Alfred Newman.
Friendly Persuasion (1956)
Max Steiner
Jezebel (1938)
The Letter (1940)
Jerome Moross
The Best Years of Our Lives (1946) - Moross is an uncredited orchestrator.
The Big Country (1958)
Hugo Friedhofer
Jezebel (1938) - Friedhofer is an uncredited orchestrator.
The Westerner (1940) - Friedhofer is an uncredited orchestrator.
The Letter (1940) - Orchestral Arrangements.
The Best Years of Our Lives (1946)Jim WynorskiNeal Acree
Militia (2000)
Extreme Limits (2000)
The Curse of the Komodo (2004)
Chuck Cirino
Chopping Mall (1986)
Deathstalker II (1987)
Big Bad Mama II (1987)
Not of This Earth (1988)
The Return of Swamp Thing (1989)
Transylvania Twist (1989)
Sorority House Massacre II (1990)
Hard to Die (1990)
976-EVIL 2: The Astral Factor (1991)
Munchie (1992)
Sins of Desire (1993)
Dinosaur Island (1994) Fred Olen Ray served as co-director.
Munchie Strikes Back (1994) 
Point of Seduction: Body Chemistry III (1994)
Ghoulies IV (1995)
Sorceress (1995)
Bare Wench Project: Uncensored (2003)
Sexy Wives Syndrome (2011)
Camel Spiders (2011)
CobraGator (2015)
Sharkansas Women's Prison Massacre (2015)
A Doggone Christmas (2016)
A Doggone Hollywood (2017)
Nessie & Me (2017)
CobraGator (2017)
Al Kaplan and Jon Kaplan
Piranhaconda (2012)
Gila! (2012)
Kevin Kiner
Demolition High (1996)
Against the Law (1997)

 Y Boaz YakinTrevor Rabin
Remember the Titans (2000)
Max (2015)Yoshikazu YasuhikoJoe Hisaishi
Arion (1986)
The Venus Wars (1989)Peter YatesJohn Barry
Murphy's War (1971) 
The Deep (1977)
Year of the Comet (1992) Rejected score
Quincy Jones
John and Mary (1969)
The Hot Rock (1971)
James Horner
Krull (1983)
The Dresser (1983)David YatesAlexandre Desplat
Harry Potter and the Deathly Hallows: Part 1 (2010)
Harry Potter and the Deathly Hallows: Part 2 (2011)
Nicholas Hooper
Punch (1996)
The Tichborne Claimant (1998)
The Way We Live Now (2001)
State of Play (2003)
The Young Visiters (2003)
The Girl in the Café (2005)
Harry Potter and the Order of the Phoenix (2007)
Harry Potter and the Half-Blood Prince (2009)
James Newton Howard
Fantastic Beasts and Where to Find Them (2016)
Fantastic Beasts: The Crimes of Grindelwald (2018)
Fantastic Beasts: The Secrets of Dumbledore (2022)
Pain Hustlers (2023)Bud YorkinDave Grusin
The Andy Williams Show (1962 - 1971)
The Andy Williams Christmas Show (1967)
Divorce American Style (1967)
P.O.P. (1984)
Henry Mancini
The Andy Williams Special (1962)
The Thief Who Came to Dinner (1973)
What's Happening!! (1976-1979) - Theme Music Only.Roger YoungPatrick Williams
Jewels (1991)
Geronimo (1993)
Mercy Mission: The Rescue of Flight 771 (1993)
Getting Gotti (1994)
The Siege at Ruby Ridge (1996)
Sisters and Other Strangers (1997)
Heart Full of Rain (1997)
Solomon (1997)
Kiss the Sky (1998)
A Knight in Camelot (1998) 
Jesus (1999)
The Thin Blue Lie (2000)
The Perfect Husband: The Laci Peterson Story (2004)
Hercules (2005)
Brad Fiedel
Dreams Don't Die (1982)
Into the Air (1985)
Under Siege (1986)Hiromasa YonebayashiTakatsugu Muramatsu
When Marnie Was There (2014)
Mary and the Witch's Flower (2017)
Modest Heroes (2018)Ronny YuGraeme Revell
Bride of Chucky (1998)
Freddy vs. Jason (2003)Robert M. YoungDavid Kitay
Roosters (1993)
Solomon & Sheba (1995)Terence YoungJohn Barry
From Russia with Love (1963)
Thunderball (1965)
John Addison
The Red Beret (1953)
That Lady (1955)
The Amorous Adventures of Moll Flanders (1965)Masaaki YuasaMichiru Oshima
The Tatami Galaxy (2005)
The Night Is Short, Walk on Girl (2017)
Ride Your Wave (2019)

 Z Alex ZammChris Hajian
Chairman of the Board (1998)
My Date's with the President's Daughter (1998)
Inspector Gadget 2 (2003)
The Haunting Hour: Don't Think About It (2007)
Dr. Dolittle: Million Dollar Mutts (2009)
Beverly Hills Chihuahua 2 (2011)
Tooth Fairy 2 (2012)
The Little Rascals Save the Day (2014)
A Royal Christmas (2014)
Jingle All the Way 2 (2014)
Crown for Christmas (2015)
Woody Woodpecker (2017)Franco ZeffirelliAlessio Vlad
Storia di una capinera (1993) with Claudio Capponi.
Jane Eyre (1996) with Claudio Capponi.
Tea with Mussolini (1999)
Callas Forever (2002)
Dmaggio a Roma (2009) Short
Nino Rota
The Taming of the Shrew (1967)
Romeo and Juliet (1968)Benh ZeitlinDan Romer
Beasts of the Southern Wild (2012)
Wendy (2020)Robert ZemeckisAlan Silvestri
Romancing the Stone (1984)
Back to the Future (1985)
Amazing Stories (1985) Episode "Go to the Head of Class"
Who Framed Roger Rabbit (1988)
Tales from the Crypt (1989–1996) - They contributed some episodes to the series.
Back to the Future Part II (1989)
Back to the Future Part III (1990)
Death Becomes Her (1992)
Forrest Gump (1994)
Contact (1997)
What Lies Beneath (2000)
Cast Away (2000)
The Polar Express (2004)
Beowulf (2007)
A Christmas Carol (2009)
Flight (2012)
The Walk (2015)
Allied (2016)
Welcome to Marwen (2018)
The Witches (2020)
Pinocchio (2022)Howard ZieffBill Conti
Private Benjamin (1980)
Unfaithfully Yours (1984)Fred ZinnemannGeorges Delerue
A Man for All Seasons (1966)
The Day of the Jackal (1973)
Julia (1977)
Dimitri Tiomkin
The Men (1950)
High Noon (1952)
The Sundowners (1960)Joseph ZitoJay Chattaway
Missing in Action (1984)
Invasion U.S.A. (1985)
Red Scorpion (1988)
Delta Force One: The Lost Patrol (2000)Rob ZombieTyler Bates
The Devil's Rejects (2005)
Halloween (2007)
Werewolf Women of the SS (2007)
Halloween II (2009)
The Haunted World of El Superbeasto (2009)David ZuckerIra Newborn
Police Squad! (1982) – They collaborated on the first episode.
The Naked Gun: From the Files of Police Squad! (1988)
The Naked Gun 2½: The Smell of Fear (1991)
Naked Gun 33 1/3: The Final Insult (1994)
High School High (1996)
BASEketball (1998)
James L. Venable
Scary Movie 3 (2003)
Scary Movie 4 (2006)
Superhero Movie (2008) – Produced by
An American Carol (2008)
Scary Movie 5 (2013)Jerry Zucker 

Maurice Jarre
Top Secret! (1984)
Ghost (1990)
A Walk in the Clouds (1995) – Produced by
Elmer Bernstein
Airplane! (1980)
Rat Race (2001) Rejected ScoreAndrzej ZulawskiAndrzej Korzynski
The Story of Triumphant Love (1969)-TV Short
Pavoncello (1969)-TV Short
The Third Part of the Night (1971)
The Devil (1972)
Possession (1981)
On the Silver Globe (1988)
My Nights Are More Beautiful Than Your Days (1989)
Szamanka (1996)
Fidelity (2000)
Cosmos (2015)Valerio ZurliniMario Nascimbene
Violent Summer (1959)
Girl with a Suitcase (1961)
The Camp Followers (1965)
Indian Summer (1972)Harald ZwartChristophe Beck
The Pink Panther 2 (2009)
The 12th Man (2017)Edward ZwickJames Horner
Glory (1989)
Legends of the Fall (1994)
Courage Under Fire (1996)
James Newton Howard
Blood Diamond (2006)
Defiance (2008)
Love & Other Drugs (2010)
Pawn Sacrifice (2014)
Miles Goodman
Having It All (1982)
The Best Times (1985) - They collaborated on one of the episodes of the series.
About Last Night... (1986)Terry Zwigoff'''
David KitayGhost World (2001)Bad Santa (2003)Art School Confidential'' (2006)

References

Music-related lists
Lists of composers
Composer Collaborations
Musical collaborations
Film director and composer
Film-related lists